This is a partial list of unnumbered minor planets for principal provisional designations assigned between 1 January and 15 September 1999. , a total of 566 bodies remain unnumbered for this period. Objects for this year are listed on the following pages: A–R · S–T and U–Y. Also see previous and next year.

A 

|- id="1999 AF4" bgcolor=#FFC2E0
| 0 ||  || AMO || 18.5 || data-sort-value="0.71" | 710 m || multiple || 1998–2022 || 24 Sep 2022 || 496 || align=left | Disc.: LINEAR || 
|- id="1999 AM10" bgcolor=#FFC2E0
| 6 ||  || APO || 21.0 || data-sort-value="0.22" | 220 m || single || 11 days || 24 Jan 1999 || 27 || align=left | Disc.: LINEAR || 
|- id="1999 AO10" bgcolor=#FFC2E0
| 6 ||  || ATE || 23.9 || data-sort-value="0.059" | 59 m || single || 33 days || 15 Feb 1999 || 73 || align=left | Disc.: LINEAR || 
|- id="1999 AX11" bgcolor=#E9E9E9
| 0 ||  || MBA-M || 17.66 || data-sort-value="0.87" | 870 m || multiple || 1999–2020 || 02 Apr 2020 || 114 || align=left | Disc.: SpacewatchAlt.: 2014 WX505 || 
|- id="1999 AS12" bgcolor=#fefefe
| 0 ||  || MBA-I || 18.03 || data-sort-value="0.74" | 740 m || multiple || 1998–2021 || 03 May 2021 || 85 || align=left | Disc.: Spacewatch || 
|- id="1999 AU12" bgcolor=#d6d6d6
| 0 ||  || MBA-O || 17.26 || 2.0 km || multiple || 1994–2021 || 07 Jun 2021 || 82 || align=left | Disc.: SpacewatchAlt.: 2015 DM118 || 
|- id="1999 AZ14" bgcolor=#E9E9E9
| 0 ||  || MBA-M || 18.11 || 1.0 km || multiple || 1999–2021 || 14 Apr 2021 || 50 || align=left | Disc.: SpacewatchAdded on 22 July 2020 || 
|- id="1999 AN16" bgcolor=#fefefe
| 2 ||  || HUN || 19.3 || data-sort-value="0.41" | 410 m || multiple || 1999–2020 || 20 Jan 2020 || 19 || align=left | Disc.: SpacewatchAlt.: 2015 BN466 || 
|- id="1999 AT18" bgcolor=#d6d6d6
| 0 ||  || MBA-O || 16.15 || 3.3 km || multiple || 1999–2021 || 02 Apr 2021 || 280 || align=left | Disc.: Spacewatch || 
|- id="1999 AW26" bgcolor=#E9E9E9
| 0 ||  || MBA-M || 17.0 || 1.2 km || multiple || 1999–2020 || 25 Apr 2020 || 146 || align=left | Disc.: Spacewatch || 
|- id="1999 AR27" bgcolor=#fefefe
| 0 ||  || MBA-I || 17.18 || 1.1 km || multiple || 1993–2021 || 13 May 2021 || 320 || align=left | Disc.: Spacewatch || 
|- id="1999 AZ27" bgcolor=#d6d6d6
| 0 ||  || MBA-O || 16.7 || 2.5 km || multiple || 1999–2019 || 29 Oct 2019 || 75 || align=left | Disc.: Spacewatch || 
|- id="1999 AS28" bgcolor=#E9E9E9
| 0 ||  || MBA-M || 16.8 || 1.8 km || multiple || 1999–2020 || 15 Feb 2020 || 180 || align=left | Disc.: SpacewatchAlt.: 2010 LN45, 2014 QC9 || 
|- id="1999 AB32" bgcolor=#d6d6d6
| 0 ||  || MBA-O || 16.8 || 2.4 km || multiple || 1999–2021 || 09 Jan 2021 || 75 || align=left | Disc.: SpacewatchAlt.: 2015 AQ4, 2016 CV58 || 
|- id="1999 AE33" bgcolor=#d6d6d6
| 0 ||  || MBA-O || 16.7 || 2.5 km || multiple || 1999–2021 || 16 Jan 2021 || 62 || align=left | Disc.: Spacewatch || 
|- id="1999 AA34" bgcolor=#E9E9E9
| 1 ||  = (618383) || MBA-M || 17.79 || data-sort-value="0.86" | 860 m || multiple || 1999–2022 || 29 Sep 2022 || 49 || align=left | Disc.: SpacewatchAdded on 19 October 2020 || 
|- id="1999 AT39" bgcolor=#fefefe
| 0 ||  || MBA-I || 17.88 || data-sort-value="0.79" | 790 m || multiple || 1999–2021 || 09 May 2021 || 128 || align=left | Disc.: Spacewatch || 
|- id="1999 AU39" bgcolor=#E9E9E9
| 0 ||  || MBA-M || 18.42 || data-sort-value="0.62" | 620 m || multiple || 1999–2020 || 25 Feb 2020 || 102 || align=left | Disc.: Spacewatch || 
|- id="1999 AW39" bgcolor=#fefefe
| 0 ||  || MBA-I || 17.8 || data-sort-value="0.82" | 820 m || multiple || 1999–2020 || 15 Oct 2020 || 70 || align=left | Disc.: Spacewatch || 
|- id="1999 AX39" bgcolor=#d6d6d6
| 0 ||  || MBA-O || 17.23 || 2.0 km || multiple || 1999–2020 || 15 Feb 2020 || 65 || align=left | Disc.: Spacewatch || 
|- id="1999 AY39" bgcolor=#d6d6d6
| 0 ||  || MBA-O || 16.8 || 2.4 km || multiple || 1999–2020 || 11 May 2020 || 52 || align=left | Disc.: Spacewatch || 
|- id="1999 AZ39" bgcolor=#d6d6d6
| 0 ||  || MBA-O || 16.7 || 2.5 km || multiple || 1999–2020 || 15 Feb 2020 || 51 || align=left | Disc.: DB MissingAdded on 19 October 2020 || 
|}
back to top

B 

|- id="1999 BO" bgcolor=#FFC2E0
| 6 || 1999 BO || AMO || 19.1 || data-sort-value="0.54" | 540 m || single || 24 days || 09 Feb 1999 || 58 || align=left | Disc.: LINEAR || 
|- id="1999 BR8" bgcolor=#fefefe
| 0 ||  || MBA-I || 18.2 || data-sort-value="0.68" | 680 m || multiple || 1999–2021 || 02 Jan 2021 || 185 || align=left | Disc.: Spacewatch || 
|- id="1999 BW27" bgcolor=#E9E9E9
| 0 ||  || MBA-M || 16.49 || 2.8 km || multiple || 1998–2022 || 20 Jan 2022 || 193 || align=left | Disc.: Spacewatch || 
|- id="1999 BT30" bgcolor=#d6d6d6
| 2 ||  = (619171) || MBA-O || 18.2 || 1.3 km || multiple || 1999–2019 || 04 Apr 2019 || 47 || align=left | Disc.: SpacewatchAlt.: 2014 DZ118 || 
|- id="1999 BA32" bgcolor=#fefefe
| 0 ||  || MBA-I || 18.79 || data-sort-value="0.52" | 520 m || multiple || 1999–2021 || 31 Oct 2021 || 46 || align=left | Disc.: Spacewatch || 
|- id="1999 BL33" bgcolor=#FFC2E0
| 7 ||  || AMO || 21.9 || data-sort-value="0.15" | 150 m || single || 21 days || 07 Feb 1999 || 17 || align=left | Disc.: Spacewatch || 
|- id="1999 BR35" bgcolor=#fefefe
| 0 ||  || MBA-I || 17.6 || data-sort-value="0.90" | 900 m || multiple || 1999–2019 || 24 Aug 2019 || 81 || align=left | Disc.: Spacewatch || 
|- id="1999 BS35" bgcolor=#d6d6d6
| 0 ||  || MBA-O || 16.5 || 2.8 km || multiple || 1999–2021 || 18 Jan 2021 || 103 || align=left | Disc.: SpacewatchAlt.: 2002 RH283 || 
|- id="1999 BT35" bgcolor=#fefefe
| 0 ||  || MBA-I || 18.62 || data-sort-value="0.56" | 560 m || multiple || 1999–2021 || 08 Sep 2021 || 77 || align=left | Disc.: Spacewatch || 
|- id="1999 BU35" bgcolor=#fefefe
| 0 ||  || MBA-I || 19.2 || data-sort-value="0.43" | 430 m || multiple || 1999–2020 || 05 Nov 2020 || 48 || align=left | Disc.: Spacewatch || 
|- id="1999 BV35" bgcolor=#E9E9E9
| 0 ||  || MBA-M || 17.8 || data-sort-value="0.82" | 820 m || multiple || 1995–2020 || 27 Apr 2020 || 52 || align=left | Disc.: Spacewatch || 
|- id="1999 BW35" bgcolor=#fefefe
| 0 ||  || MBA-I || 18.66 || data-sort-value="0.55" | 550 m || multiple || 1999–2021 || 25 Apr 2021 || 56 || align=left | Disc.: SpacewatchAdded on 11 May 2021 || 
|}
back to top

C 

|- id="1999 CQ2" bgcolor=#FFC2E0
| 8 ||  || APO || 27.3 || data-sort-value="0.012" | 12 m || single || 6 days || 13 Feb 1999 || 16 || align=left | Disc.: Spacewatch || 
|- id="1999 CS3" bgcolor=#FA8072
| 5 ||  || MCA || 18.7 || data-sort-value="0.54" | 540 m || single || 38 days || 20 Mar 1999 || 48 || align=left | Disc.: LINEAR || 
|- id="1999 CG9" bgcolor=#FFC2E0
| 5 ||  || APO || 25.2 || data-sort-value="0.032" | 32 m || single || 24 days || 06 Mar 1999 || 42 || align=left | Disc.: LINEAR || 
|- id="1999 CO13" bgcolor=#E9E9E9
| 0 ||  || MBA-M || 17.65 || data-sort-value="0.88" | 880 m || multiple || 1999–2021 || 30 Jul 2021 || 84 || align=left | Disc.: ODAS || 
|- id="1999 CW118" bgcolor=#C2E0FF
| E ||  || TNO || 7.8 || 95 km || single || 86 days || 07 May 1999 || 7 || align=left | Disc.: Mauna Kea Obs.LoUTNOs, cubewano? || 
|- id="1999 CX118" bgcolor=#C2E0FF
| E ||  || TNO || 7.1 || 130 km || single || 62 days || 13 Apr 1999 || 6 || align=left | Disc.: Mauna Kea Obs.LoUTNOs, cubewano? || 
|- id="1999 CY118" bgcolor=#C2E0FF
| 3 ||  || TNO || 8.67 || 70 km || multiple || 1999–2017 || 03 Mar 2017 || 37 || align=left | Disc.: Mauna Kea Obs.LoUTNOs, SDO || 
|- id="1999 CZ118" bgcolor=#C2E0FF
| 1 ||  || TNO || 7.9 || 99 km || multiple || 1999–2016 || 13 Mar 2016 || 29 || align=left | Disc.: Mauna Kea Obs.LoUTNOs, SDO || 
|- id="1999 CA119" bgcolor=#C2E0FF
| E ||  || TNO || 7.7 || 99 km || single || 86 days || 07 May 1999 || 6 || align=left | Disc.: Mauna Kea Obs.LoUTNOs, cubewano? || 
|- id="1999 CB119" bgcolor=#C2E0FF
| 4 ||  || TNO || 7.0 || 204 km || multiple || 1999–2022 || 08 Apr 2022 || 30 || align=left | Disc.: Mauna Kea Obs.LoUTNOs, cubewano (hot), BR-mag: 1.93; taxonomy: RR || 
|- id="1999 CC119" bgcolor=#C2E0FF
| 2 ||  || TNO || 7.2 || 121 km || multiple || 1999–2019 || 05 Apr 2019 || 31 || align=left | Disc.: Mauna Kea Obs.LoUTNOs, cubewano (cold) || 
|- id="1999 CD119" bgcolor=#C2E0FF
| E ||  || TNO || 7.3 || 119 km || single || 62 days || 13 Apr 1999 || 6 || align=left | Disc.: Mauna Kea Obs.LoUTNOs, cubewano? || 
|- id="1999 CF119" bgcolor=#C2E0FF
| 0 ||  || TNO || 7.2 || 137 km || multiple || 1999–2016 || 29 Dec 2016 || 48 || align=left | Disc.: Mauna Kea Obs.LoUTNOs, SDO, BR-mag: 1.46; taxonomy: BR-IR || 
|- id="1999 CH119" bgcolor=#C2E0FF
| 2 ||  || TNO || 7.1 || 158 km || multiple || 1999–2018 || 15 Mar 2018 || 24 || align=left | Disc.: Mauna Kea Obs.LoUTNOs, other TNO || 
|- id="1999 CJ119" bgcolor=#C2E0FF
| 2 ||  || TNO || 7.4 || 110 km || multiple || 1999–2018 || 18 Mar 2018 || 33 || align=left | Disc.: Mauna Kea Obs.LoUTNOs, cubewano (cold), BR-mag: 2.07 || 
|- id="1999 CK119" bgcolor=#C2E0FF
| E ||  || TNO || 7.9 || 90 km || single || 8 days || 19 Feb 1999 || 4 || align=left | Disc.: Mauna Kea Obs.LoUTNOs, cubewano? || 
|- id="1999 CL119" bgcolor=#C2E0FF
| 2 ||  || TNO || 6.1 || 251 km || multiple || 1999–2020 || 22 Dec 2020 || 86 || align=left | Disc.: Mauna Kea Obs.LoUTNOs, other TNO, BR-mag: 1.78 || 
|- id="1999 CM119" bgcolor=#C2E0FF
| 3 ||  || TNO || 7.9 || 87 km || multiple || 1999–2005 || 03 Nov 2005 || 14 || align=left | Disc.: Mauna Kea Obs.LoUTNOs, cubewano (cold), BR-mag: 1.78 || 
|- id="1999 CN119" bgcolor=#C2E0FF
| 3 ||  || TNO || 8.1 || 80 km || multiple || 1999–2018 || 09 Dec 2018 || 21 || align=left | Disc.: Mauna Kea Obs.LoUTNOs, cubewano (cold) || 
|- id="1999 CD129" bgcolor=#d6d6d6
| 0 ||  || MBA-O || 17.19 || 2.0 km || multiple || 1992–2021 || 08 May 2021 || 77 || align=left | Disc.: Mauna Kea Obs.Added on 17 January 2021Alt.: 2018 TM19 || 
|- id="1999 CM129" bgcolor=#E9E9E9
| 0 ||  || MBA-M || 17.50 || data-sort-value="0.94" | 940 m || multiple || 1995–2021 || 08 Sep 2021 || 71 || align=left | Disc.: Mauna Kea Obs.Added on 17 January 2021Alt.: 2017 MQ15 || 
|- id="1999 CZ129" bgcolor=#E9E9E9
| 1 ||  || MBA-M || 18.19 || data-sort-value="0.75" | 750 m || multiple || 1999–2022 || 27 Aug 2022 || 61 || align=left | Disc.: Mauna Kea Obs. || 
|- id="1999 CB130" bgcolor=#d6d6d6
| – ||  || MBA-O || — || — || single || 2 days || 08 Feb 1999 || 6 || align=left | Disc.: Mauna Kea Obs. || 
|- id="1999 CD130" bgcolor=#fefefe
| 1 ||  || MBA-I || 19.0 || data-sort-value="0.90" | 470 m || multiple || 1999-2020 || 23 May 2020 || 44 || align=left | Disc.: Mauna Kea Obs. Alt.: 2020 HM81 || 
|- id="1999 CE130" bgcolor=#d6d6d6
| E ||  || MBA-O || — || — || single || 3 days || 09 Feb 1999 || 8 || align=left | Disc.: Mauna Kea Obs. || 
|- id="1999 CH130" bgcolor=#E9E9E9
| 0 ||  || MBA-M || 17.61 || 1.3 km || multiple || 1999–2021 || 13 May 2021 || 95 || align=left | Disc.: Mauna Kea Obs. || 
|- id="1999 CL130" bgcolor=#fefefe
| 0 ||  || MBA-I || 18.4 || data-sort-value="0.62" | 620 m || multiple || 1999–2020 || 20 Oct 2020 || 32 || align=left | Disc.: Mauna Kea Obs. || 
|- id="1999 CS130" bgcolor=#d6d6d6
| 0 ||  || MBA-O || 17.68 || 1.6 km || multiple || 1999–2021 || 06 Oct 2021 || 54 || align=left | Disc.: Mauna Kea Obs.Added on 22 July 2020 || 
|- id="1999 CD131" bgcolor=#fefefe
| 1 ||  || MBA-I || 18.9 || data-sort-value="0.49" | 490 m || multiple || 1999–2020 || 14 Aug 2020 || 55 || align=left | Disc.: Mauna Kea Obs. || 
|- id="1999 CW131" bgcolor=#C2E0FF
| E ||  || TNO || 7.9 || 90 km || multiple || 1999–2000 || 07 Apr 2000 || 8 || align=left | Disc.: Mauna Kea Obs.LoUTNOs, cubewano? || 
|- id="1999 CX131" bgcolor=#C2E0FF
| 2 ||  || TNO || 7.1 || 138 km || multiple || 1999–2018 || 17 Mar 2018 || 33 || align=left | Disc.: Mauna Kea Obs.LoUTNOs, res3:5, BR-mag: 1.64; taxonomy: IR || 
|- id="1999 CY131" bgcolor=#C2E0FF
| E ||  || TNO || 8.1 || 100 km || single || 8 days || 19 Feb 1999 || 4 || align=left | Disc.: Mauna Kea Obs.LoUTNOs, other TNO || 
|- id="1999 CZ131" bgcolor=#C2E0FF
| E ||  || TNO || 8.1 || 82 km || single || 8 days || 19 Feb 1999 || 4 || align=left | Disc.: Mauna Kea Obs.LoUTNOs, cubewano? || 
|- id="1999 CA132" bgcolor=#C2E0FF
| E ||  || TNO || 7.4 || 114 km || single || 56 days || 08 Apr 1999 || 6 || align=left | Disc.: Mauna Kea Obs.LoUTNOs, cubewano? || 
|- id="1999 CQ133" bgcolor=#C2E0FF
| 4 ||  || TNO || 6.91 || 213 km || multiple || 1999–2021 || 20 Mar 2021 || 32 || align=left | Disc.: Mauna Kea Obs.LoUTNOs, cubewano (hot), BR-mag: 1.35 || 
|- id="1999 CR133" bgcolor=#C2E0FF
| E ||  || TNO || 8.1 || 82 km || single || 6 days || 18 Feb 1999 || 4 || align=left | Disc.: Mauna Kea Obs.LoUTNOs, cubewano? || 
|- id="1999 CU133" bgcolor=#FA8072
| 0 ||  || MCA || 19.09 || data-sort-value="0.45" | 450 m || multiple || 1999–2021 || 05 Jul 2021 || 51 || align=left | Disc.: SpacewatchAdded on 22 July 2020 || 
|- id="1999 CR135" bgcolor=#E9E9E9
| 0 ||  || MBA-M || 17.21 || 1.5 km || multiple || 1999–2021 || 10 Sep 2021 || 116 || align=left | Disc.: SpacewatchAlt.: 2016 EF176 || 
|- id="1999 CU136" bgcolor=#d6d6d6
| 0 ||  || MBA-O || 16.6 || 2.7 km || multiple || 1999–2021 || 18 Jan 2021 || 147 || align=left | Disc.: Spacewatch || 
|- id="1999 CU138" bgcolor=#d6d6d6
| 0 ||  || MBA-O || 17.38 || 1.9 km || multiple || 1999–2019 || 06 May 2019 || 87 || align=left | Disc.: Spacewatch || 
|- id="1999 CP140" bgcolor=#E9E9E9
| 0 ||  || MBA-M || 17.49 || data-sort-value="0.94" | 940 m || multiple || 1999–2021 || 28 Sep 2021 || 166 || align=left | Disc.: SpacewatchAlt.: 2007 CB8 || 
|- id="1999 CB141" bgcolor=#E9E9E9
| 0 ||  || MBA-M || 17.9 || 1.5 km || multiple || 1999–2021 || 12 Jan 2021 || 58 || align=left | Disc.: SpacewatchAdded on 17 January 2021Alt.: 2017 CE26 || 
|- id="1999 CF141" bgcolor=#fefefe
| 0 ||  || MBA-I || 18.1 || data-sort-value="0.71" | 710 m || multiple || 1999–2019 || 25 Jun 2019 || 82 || align=left | Disc.: SpacewatchAlt.: 2015 HT150 || 
|- id="1999 CG142" bgcolor=#d6d6d6
| 0 ||  || MBA-O || 17.27 || 2.0 km || multiple || 1999–2021 || 10 Aug 2021 || 65 || align=left | Disc.: Spacewatch || 
|- id="1999 CE143" bgcolor=#d6d6d6
| 0 ||  || MBA-O || 17.37 || 1.9 km || multiple || 1999–2021 || 10 May 2021 || 62 || align=left | Disc.: Mauna Kea Obs. || 
|- id="1999 CK143" bgcolor=#fefefe
| 0 ||  || MBA-I || 18.4 || data-sort-value="0.62" | 620 m || multiple || 1999–2016 || 31 Aug 2016 || 47 || align=left | Disc.: Mauna Kea Obs.Added on 30 September 2021Alt.: 2015 BD144, 2015 FV449 || 
|- id="1999 CB144" bgcolor=#d6d6d6
| 0 ||  || MBA-O || 17.34 || 1.9 km || multiple || 1999–2021 || 11 Sep 2021 || 55 || align=left | Disc.: Mauna Kea Obs. || 
|- id="1999 CQ144" bgcolor=#fefefe
| 0 ||  || MBA-I || 19.0 || data-sort-value="0.47" | 470 m || multiple || 1999–2018 || 08 Nov 2018 || 44 || align=left | Disc.: Mauna Kea Obs.Alt.: 2011 SQ44 || 
|- id="1999 CS144" bgcolor=#E9E9E9
| 0 ||  || MBA-M || 18.0 || 1.1 km || multiple || 1999–2020 || 26 Jan 2020 || 39 || align=left | Disc.: Mauna Kea Obs.Added on 17 January 2021 || 
|- id="1999 CU152" bgcolor=#fefefe
| 0 ||  || MBA-I || 17.7 || data-sort-value="0.86" | 860 m || multiple || 1999–2020 || 17 Nov 2020 || 68 || align=left | Disc.: SpacewatchAdded on 17 January 2021 || 
|- id="1999 CM153" bgcolor=#C2E0FF
| 3 ||  || TNO || 7.4 || 110 km || multiple || 1999–2015 || 23 Mar 2015 || 25 || align=left | Disc.: Mauna Kea Obs.LoUTNOs, cubewano (cold) || 
|- id="1999 CN153" bgcolor=#C2E0FF
| 9 ||  || TNO || 7.70 || 148 km || multiple || 1999–2006 || 02 Mar 2006 || 19 || align=left | Disc.: Mauna Kea Obs.LoUTNOs, cubewano (hot) || 
|- id="1999 CP153" bgcolor=#C2E0FF
| E ||  || TNO || 7.7 || 99 km || multiple || 1999–2000 || 07 Apr 2000 || 11 || align=left | Disc.: Mauna Kea Obs.LoUTNOs, cubewano? || 
|- id="1999 CQ153" bgcolor=#C2E0FF
| 5 ||  || TNO || 8.0 || 83 km || multiple || 1999–2015 || 20 Mar 2015 || 14 || align=left | Disc.: Mauna Kea Obs.LoUTNOs, cubewano (cold) || 
|- id="1999 CR153" bgcolor=#C2E0FF
| E ||  || TNO || 8.2 || 79 km || single || 31 days || 14 Mar 1999 || 4 || align=left | Disc.: Mauna Kea Obs.LoUTNOs, cubewano? || 
|- id="1999 CS153" bgcolor=#C2E0FF
| E ||  || TNO || 8.1 || 82 km || multiple || 1999–2000 || 07 Apr 2000 || 10 || align=left | Disc.: Mauna Kea Obs.LoUTNOs, cubewano? || 
|- id="1999 CT153" bgcolor=#C2E0FF
| E ||  || TNO || 8.1 || 82 km || single || 32 days || 15 Mar 1999 || 4 || align=left | Disc.: Mauna Kea Obs.LoUTNOs, cubewano? || 
|- id="1999 CU153" bgcolor=#C2E0FF
| 3 ||  || TNO || 7.2 || 121 km || multiple || 1999–2018 || 18 Mar 2018 || 32 || align=left | Disc.: Mauna Kea Obs.LoUTNOs, cubewano (cold) || 
|- id="1999 CG154" bgcolor=#C2E0FF
| 5 ||  || TNO || 7.4 || 110 km || multiple || 1999–2005 || 10 Mar 2005 || 15 || align=left | Disc.: Mauna Kea Obs.LoUTNOs, cubewano (cold) || 
|- id="1999 CH154" bgcolor=#C2E0FF
| 5 ||  || TNO || 7.66 || 98 km || multiple || 1999–2015 || 16 Mar 2015 || 13 || align=left | Disc.: Mauna Kea Obs.LoUTNOs, cubewano (cold) || 
|- id="1999 CL154" bgcolor=#fefefe
| E ||  || MBA-I || — || — || single || 2 days || 08 Feb 1999 || 6 || align=left | Disc.: Mauna Kea Obs. || 
|- id="1999 CM154" bgcolor=#d6d6d6
| 6 ||  || MBA-O || 16.7 || 2.5 km || multiple || 1999–2020 || 11 Nov 2020 || 9 || align=left | Disc.: Mauna Kea Obs. || 
|- id="1999 CN154" bgcolor=#d6d6d6
| E ||  || MBA-O || — || — || single || 2 days || 08 Feb 1999 || 6 || align=left | Disc.: Mauna Kea Obs. || 
|- id="1999 CO154" bgcolor=#E9E9E9
| 1 ||  || MBA-M || 17.1 || 1.1 km || multiple || 1997–2020 || 16 Mar 2020 || 62 || align=left | Disc.: Anderson MesaAlt.: 1997 UJ23, 2005 SV258 || 
|- id="1999 CM155" bgcolor=#d6d6d6
| E ||  || MBA-O || — || — || single || 2 days || 08 Feb 1999 || 6 || align=left | Disc.: Mauna Kea Obs. || 
|- id="1999 CR155" bgcolor=#FA8072
| 1 ||  ||  MCA  || 17.6 || data-sort-value="0.71" | 900 m || multiple || 1999-2021 || 10 Apr 2021 || 66 || align=left | Disc.: LONEOS Alt.: 2010 CV75 || 
|- id="1999 CU156" bgcolor=#d6d6d6
| 0 ||  || MBA-O || 16.16 || 3.3 km || multiple || 1999–2021 || 09 Apr 2021 || 93 || align=left | Disc.: SpacewatchAlt.: 2010 LS3, 2015 AJ16 || 
|- id="1999 CK158" bgcolor=#C2E0FF
| 3 ||  || TNO || 8.3 || 91 km || multiple || 1999–2018 || 18 Feb 2018 || 19 || align=left | Disc.: Mauna Kea Obs.LoUTNOs, other TNO || 
|- id="1999 CM158" bgcolor=#C2E0FF
| 1 ||  || TNO || 7.8 || 130 km || multiple || 1999–2016 || 13 Mar 2016 || 51 || align=left | Disc.: Mauna Kea Obs.LoUTNOs, plutino, binary: 61 km || 
|- id="1999 CT158" bgcolor=#d6d6d6
| 0 ||  || MBA-O || 16.6 || 2.7 km || multiple || 1999–2021 || 04 Jan 2021 || 64 || align=left | Disc.: Spacewatch || 
|- id="1999 CF160" bgcolor=#fefefe
| 0 ||  || MBA-I || 17.7 || data-sort-value="0.86" | 860 m || multiple || 1999–2020 || 17 Nov 2020 || 97 || align=left | Disc.: Spacewatch || 
|- id="1999 CG160" bgcolor=#fefefe
| 0 ||  || MBA-I || 18.54 || data-sort-value="0.58" | 580 m || multiple || 1999–2021 || 09 Aug 2021 || 109 || align=left | Disc.: Spacewatch || 
|- id="1999 CH160" bgcolor=#E9E9E9
| 0 ||  || MBA-M || 17.6 || data-sort-value="0.90" | 900 m || multiple || 1999–2020 || 28 Feb 2020 || 111 || align=left | Disc.: Spacewatch || 
|- id="1999 CJ160" bgcolor=#fefefe
| 0 ||  || MBA-I || 18.1 || data-sort-value="0.71" | 710 m || multiple || 1999–2021 || 04 Jan 2021 || 166 || align=left | Disc.: Spacewatch || 
|- id="1999 CK160" bgcolor=#E9E9E9
| 0 ||  || MBA-M || 17.46 || 1.4 km || multiple || 1999–2021 || 09 May 2021 || 94 || align=left | Disc.: Spacewatch || 
|- id="1999 CM160" bgcolor=#E9E9E9
| 0 ||  || MBA-M || 17.33 || 1.4 km || multiple || 1999–2021 || 15 May 2021 || 64 || align=left | Disc.: SpacewatchAlt.: 2016 BB20 || 
|- id="1999 CN160" bgcolor=#fefefe
| 0 ||  || MBA-I || 17.86 || data-sort-value="0.80" | 800 m || multiple || 1999–2021 || 08 Jul 2021 || 81 || align=left | Disc.: Spacewatch || 
|- id="1999 CP160" bgcolor=#d6d6d6
| 0 ||  || MBA-O || 16.51 || 2.8 km || multiple || 1999–2021 || 17 Apr 2021 || 100 || align=left | Disc.: SpacewatchAlt.: 2010 KH85 || 
|}
back to top

D 

|- id="1999 DA" bgcolor=#C2E0FF
| 3 || 1999 DA || TNO || 7.9 || 87 km || multiple || 1999–2015 || 24 Apr 2015 || 46 || align=left | Disc.: Mauna Kea Obs.LoUTNOs, cubewano (cold) || 
|- id="1999 DB2" bgcolor=#FFC2E0
| 0 ||  || AMO || 19.0 || data-sort-value="0.56" | 560 m || multiple || 1999–2020 || 13 Jun 2020 || 189 || align=left | Disc.: LINEAR || 
|- id="1999 DY2" bgcolor=#FFC2E0
| 5 ||  || AMO || 21.9 || data-sort-value="0.15" | 150 m || single || 56 days || 15 Apr 1999 || 74 || align=left | Disc.: LINEAR || 
|- id="1999 DJ3" bgcolor=#FFC2E0
| 3 ||  || AMO || 20.9 || data-sort-value="0.23" | 230 m || multiple || 1999–2012 || 10 Mar 2012 || 43 || align=left | Disc.: Spacewatch || 
|- id="1999 DZ7" bgcolor=#C2E0FF
| E ||  || TNO || 8.8 || 82 km || single || 1 day || 17 Feb 1999 || 4 || align=left | Disc.: Mauna Kea Obs.LoUTNOs, plutino? || 
|- id="1999 DA8" bgcolor=#C2E0FF
| E ||  || TNO || 12.4 || 16 km || single || 1 day || 17 Feb 1999 || 6 || align=left | Disc.: Mauna Kea Obs.LoUTNOs, plutino? || 
|- id="1999 DB8" bgcolor=#C2E0FF
| E ||  || TNO || 10.0 || 42 km || single || 35 days || 23 Mar 1999 || 7 || align=left | Disc.: Mauna Kea Obs.LoUTNOs, other TNO || 
|- id="1999 DC8" bgcolor=#C2E0FF
| E ||  || TNO || 10.0 || 34 km || single || 1 day || 17 Feb 1999 || 4 || align=left | Disc.: Mauna Kea Obs.LoUTNOs, cubewano? || 
|- id="1999 DD8" bgcolor=#C2E0FF
| E ||  || TNO || 11.1 || 28 km || single || 1 day || 17 Feb 1999 || 5 || align=left | Disc.: Mauna Kea Obs.LoUTNOs, plutino? || 
|- id="1999 DE8" bgcolor=#C2E0FF
| E ||  || TNO || 9.6 || 41 km || single || 1 day || 17 Feb 1999 || 4 || align=left | Disc.: Mauna Kea Obs.LoUTNOs, cubewano? || 
|- id="1999 DF8" bgcolor=#C2E0FF
| E ||  || TNO || 9.9 || 36 km || single || 1 day || 17 Feb 1999 || 4 || align=left | Disc.: Mauna Kea Obs.LoUTNOs, cubewano? || 
|- id="1999 DG8" bgcolor=#C2E0FF
| E ||  || TNO || 8.1 || 91 km || single || 1 day || 17 Feb 1999 || 4 || align=left | Disc.: Mauna Kea Obs.LoUTNOs, SDO || 
|- id="1999 DH8" bgcolor=#C2E0FF
| 5 ||  || TNO || 8.7 || 60 km || multiple || 1999–2001 || 24 Feb 2001 || 11 || align=left | Disc.: Mauna Kea Obs.LoUTNOs, cubewano (cold) || 
|- id="1999 DL8" bgcolor=#C2E0FF
| E ||  || TNO || 9.6 || 62 km || single || 35 days || 23 Mar 1999 || 6 || align=left | Disc.: Mauna Kea Obs.LoUTNOs, cubewano (hot) || 
|- id="1999 DM8" bgcolor=#C2E0FF
| E ||  || TNO || 9.7 || 39 km || single || 1 day || 17 Feb 1999 || 4 || align=left | Disc.: Mauna Kea Obs.LoUTNOs, cubewano? || 
|- id="1999 DN8" bgcolor=#C2E0FF
| E ||  || TNO || 9.8 || 38 km || single || 1 day || 17 Feb 1999 || 4 || align=left | Disc.: Mauna Kea Obs.LoUTNOs, cubewano? || 
|- id="1999 DO8" bgcolor=#C2E0FF
| E ||  || TNO || 10.0 || 34 km || single || 1 day || 17 Feb 1999 || 4 || align=left | Disc.: Mauna Kea Obs.LoUTNOs, cubewano? || 
|- id="1999 DP8" bgcolor=#C2E0FF
| E ||  || TNO || 8.9 || 63 km || single || 1 day || 17 Feb 1999 || 4 || align=left | Disc.: Mauna Kea Obs.LoUTNOs, SDO || 
|- id="1999 DQ8" bgcolor=#C2E0FF
| E ||  || TNO || 9.1 || 52 km || single || 1 day || 17 Feb 1999 || 4 || align=left | Disc.: Mauna Kea Obs.LoUTNOs, cubewano? || 
|- id="1999 DR8" bgcolor=#C2E0FF
| E ||  || TNO || 9.3 || 47 km || single || 1 day || 17 Feb 1999 || 4 || align=left | Disc.: Mauna Kea Obs.LoUTNOs, cubewano? || 
|}
back to top

E 

|- id="1999 EO3" bgcolor=#FFC2E0
| 0 ||  || AMO || 19.09 || data-sort-value="0.54" | 540 m || multiple || 1999–2021 || 17 Apr 2021 || 308 || align=left | Disc.: Spacewatch || 
|- id="1999 EF5" bgcolor=#FFC2E0
| 1 ||  || AMO || 19.4 || data-sort-value="0.47" | 470 m || multiple || 1999–2019 || 27 Mar 2019 || 99 || align=left | Disc.: LINEAR || 
|- id="1999 ES6" bgcolor=#fefefe
| 2 ||  || MBA-I || 18.86 || data-sort-value="0.50" | 500 m || multiple || 1999–2021 || 14 Apr 2021 || 35 || align=left | Disc.: SpacewatchAlt.: 2021 BS4 || 
|- id="1999 EU7" bgcolor=#E9E9E9
| 0 ||  || MBA-M || 17.91 || 1.1 km || multiple || 1999–2021 || 13 Apr 2021 || 64 || align=left | Disc.: SpacewatchAdded on 9 March 2021 || 
|- id="1999 EY9" bgcolor=#fefefe
| 0 ||  || MBA-I || 17.7 || data-sort-value="0.86" | 860 m || multiple || 1999–2021 || 15 Jan 2021 || 168 || align=left | Disc.: SpacewatchAlt.: 2010 CT27 || 
|- id="1999 EN11" bgcolor=#E9E9E9
| 2 ||  || MBA-M || 17.56 || data-sort-value="0.86" | 900 m || multiple || 1999-2022 || 14 Dec 2022 || 36 || align=left | Disc.: Spacewatch || 
|- id="1999 EE14" bgcolor=#E9E9E9
| 0 ||  || MBA-M || 16.72 || 1.9 km || multiple || 1999–2021 || 17 Apr 2021 || 203 || align=left | Disc.: Spacewatch || 
|- id="1999 EL15" bgcolor=#d6d6d6
| 0 ||  || MBA-O || 15.9 || 3.7 km || multiple || 1999–2020 || 22 May 2020 || 161 || align=left | Disc.: Spacewatch || 
|- id="1999 EM15" bgcolor=#d6d6d6
| 0 ||  || MBA-O || 17.05 || 2.2 km || multiple || 1999–2021 || 06 Nov 2021 || 106 || align=left | Disc.: Spacewatch || 
|- id="1999 EN15" bgcolor=#E9E9E9
| 1 ||  || MBA-M || 17.2 || 1.5 km || multiple || 1999–2020 || 23 Apr 2020 || 98 || align=left | Disc.: Spacewatch || 
|- id="1999 EO15" bgcolor=#E9E9E9
| 0 ||  || MBA-M || 16.7 || 1.9 km || multiple || 1999–2020 || 22 Apr 2020 || 107 || align=left | Disc.: SpacewatchAlt.: 2016 BR10 || 
|- id="1999 EQ15" bgcolor=#E9E9E9
| 0 ||  || MBA-M || 16.60 || 1.4 km || multiple || 1999–2021 || 31 Oct 2021 || 145 || align=left | Disc.: SpacewatchAlt.: 2010 BU93 || 
|- id="1999 ER15" bgcolor=#fefefe
| 0 ||  || MBA-I || 18.76 || data-sort-value="0.53" | 530 m || multiple || 1999–2021 || 13 Jul 2021 || 51 || align=left | Disc.: Spacewatch || 
|}
back to top

F 

|- id="1999 FR5" bgcolor=#FFC2E0
| 7 ||  || APO || 23.4 || data-sort-value="0.074" | 74 m || single || 6 days || 25 Mar 1999 || 77 || align=left | Disc.: LINEAR || 
|- id="1999 FQ10" bgcolor=#FFC2E0
| 8 ||  || APO || 23.2 || data-sort-value="0.081" | 81 m || single || 4 days || 24 Mar 1999 || 15 || align=left | Disc.: LINEAR || 
|- id="1999 FN19" bgcolor=#FFC2E0
| 0 ||  || APO || 22.5 || data-sort-value="0.11" | 110 m || multiple || 1999–2018 || 11 Aug 2018 || 320 || align=left | Disc.: LINEARAMO at MPC || 
|- id="1999 FP19" bgcolor=#FFC2E0
| 1 ||  || APO || 20.1 || data-sort-value="0.34" | 340 m || multiple || 1999–2018 || 09 Sep 2018 || 75 || align=left | Disc.: LINEAR || 
|- id="1999 FR19" bgcolor=#FFC2E0
| 8 ||  || APO || 22.0 || data-sort-value="0.14" | 140 m || single || 3 days || 25 Mar 1999 || 39 || align=left | Disc.: LINEARPotentially hazardous object || 
|- id="1999 FJ21" bgcolor=#FFC2E0
| 0 ||  || APO || 20.21 || data-sort-value="0.32" | 320 m || multiple || 1999–2021 || 31 Oct 2021 || 274 || align=left | Disc.: Spacewatch || 
|- id="1999 FP63" bgcolor=#fefefe
| 0 ||  || MBA-I || 18.05 || data-sort-value="0.73" | 730 m || multiple || 1999–2021 || 07 Apr 2021 || 214 || align=left | Disc.: SDSSAlt.: 2014 JF16 || 
|- id="1999 FV63" bgcolor=#E9E9E9
| 0 ||  || MBA-M || 17.10 || 1.6 km || multiple || 1999–2021 || 02 May 2021 || 161 || align=left | Disc.: SDSSAlt.: 2008 EE17 || 
|- id="1999 FJ64" bgcolor=#d6d6d6
| 0 ||  || MBA-O || 17.0 || 2.2 km || multiple || 1999–2021 || 17 Apr 2021 || 45 || align=left | Disc.: SDSSAdded on 11 May 2021Alt.: 2010 KL120 || 
|- id="1999 FN64" bgcolor=#d6d6d6
| 0 ||  || MBA-O || 17.27 || 2.0 km || multiple || 1999–2021 || 11 May 2021 || 71 || align=left | Disc.: SDSS || 
|- id="1999 FY64" bgcolor=#E9E9E9
| 0 ||  || MBA-M || 18.4 || data-sort-value="0.88" | 880 m || multiple || 1999–2021 || 15 Mar 2021 || 47 || align=left | Disc.: SDSSAdded on 11 May 2021Alt.: 2017 HK45 || 
|- id="1999 FA65" bgcolor=#d6d6d6
| 0 ||  || MBA-O || 17.0 || 2.2 km || multiple || 1999–2020 || 19 Apr 2020 || 56 || align=left | Disc.: SDSSAdded on 22 July 2020 || 
|- id="1999 FK65" bgcolor=#d6d6d6
| 0 ||  || MBA-O || 16.51 || 2.8 km || multiple || 1999–2021 || 01 Dec 2021 || 124 || align=left | Disc.: SDSSAlt.: 2011 UJ392 || 
|- id="1999 FL65" bgcolor=#fefefe
| 0 ||  || MBA-I || 18.20 || data-sort-value="0.68" | 680 m || multiple || 1999–2020 || 12 Dec 2020 || 63 || align=left | Disc.: SDSSAdded on 11 May 2021Alt.: 2013 YE165 || 
|- id="1999 FV65" bgcolor=#E9E9E9
| 2 ||  || MBA-M || 18.6 || data-sort-value="0.57" | 570 m || multiple || 1999–2020 || 29 Apr 2020 || 33 || align=left | Disc.: SDSS || 
|- id="1999 FP66" bgcolor=#E9E9E9
| 0 ||  || MBA-M || 17.70 || 1.6 km || multiple || 1999–2022 || 27 Jan 2022 || 60 || align=left | Disc.: SDSS || 
|- id="1999 FU66" bgcolor=#E9E9E9
| 0 ||  || MBA-M || 17.0 || 1.7 km || multiple || 1999–2020 || 18 Apr 2020 || 112 || align=left | Disc.: SDSS || 
|- id="1999 FW66" bgcolor=#E9E9E9
| 0 ||  || MBA-M || 17.6 || 1.7 km || multiple || 1999–2019 || 27 Oct 2019 || 41 || align=left | Disc.: SDSSAdded on 22 July 2020Alt.: 2008 CY150 || 
|- id="1999 FP67" bgcolor=#fefefe
| 0 ||  || MBA-I || 18.80 || data-sort-value="0.52" | 520 m || multiple || 1999–2021 || 14 May 2021 || 265 || align=left | Disc.: SDSSAlt.: 2017 DT97 || 
|- id="1999 FT67" bgcolor=#E9E9E9
| 0 ||  || MBA-M || 16.66 || 2.6 km || multiple || 1999–2022 || 08 Jan 2022 || 93 || align=left | Disc.: SDSS || 
|- id="1999 FU67" bgcolor=#d6d6d6
| 0 ||  || MBA-O || 16.92 || 2.3 km || multiple || 1999–2021 || 15 Mar 2021 || 44 || align=left | Disc.: SDSSAdded on 11 May 2021 || 
|- id="1999 FT68" bgcolor=#fefefe
| 3 ||  || MBA-I || 19.1 || data-sort-value="0.45" | 450 m || multiple || 1999–2016 || 03 Apr 2016 || 27 || align=left | Disc.: SDSS || 
|- id="1999 FU68" bgcolor=#E9E9E9
| 1 ||  || MBA-M || 18.8 || data-sort-value="0.73" | 730 m || multiple || 1999–2020 || 22 Apr 2020 || 56 || align=left | Disc.: SDSSAdded on 22 July 2020 || 
|- id="1999 FV68" bgcolor=#d6d6d6
| 0 ||  || MBA-O || 17.7 || 1.6 km || multiple || 1999–2020 || 12 Apr 2020 || 37 || align=left | Disc.: SDSS || 
|- id="1999 FW68" bgcolor=#d6d6d6
| 0 ||  || MBA-O || 17.4 || 1.8 km || multiple || 1999–2020 || 16 Oct 2020 || 34 || align=left | Disc.: SDSSAdded on 9 March 2021 || 
|- id="1999 FX68" bgcolor=#E9E9E9
| 0 ||  || MBA-M || 18.0 || 1.1 km || multiple || 1999–2021 || 04 Oct 2021 || 90 || align=left | Disc.: SDSS || 
|- id="1999 FA69" bgcolor=#E9E9E9
| 0 ||  || MBA-M || 17.7 || 1.2 km || multiple || 1999–2020 || 22 Apr 2020 || 130 || align=left | Disc.: SDSS || 
|- id="1999 FD69" bgcolor=#E9E9E9
| 0 ||  || MBA-M || 16.59 || 1.4 km || multiple || 1999–2021 || 04 Oct 2021 || 212 || align=left | Disc.: SDSSAlt.: 2003 ES7, 2013 SE92 || 
|- id="1999 FK69" bgcolor=#E9E9E9
| 1 ||  || MBA-M || 18.0 || data-sort-value="0.75" | 750 m || multiple || 1999–2018 || 16 Dec 2018 || 30 || align=left | Disc.: SDSS || 
|- id="1999 FL69" bgcolor=#fefefe
| 0 ||  || MBA-I || 18.41 || data-sort-value="0.62" | 620 m || multiple || 1999–2021 || 08 Sep 2021 || 68 || align=left | Disc.: SDSSAlt.: 2006 DF107, 2011 UU227 || 
|- id="1999 FO69" bgcolor=#E9E9E9
| 0 ||  || MBA-M || 17.71 || data-sort-value="0.85" | 850 m || multiple || 1999–2021 || 10 Sep 2021 || 84 || align=left | Disc.: SDSS || 
|- id="1999 FP69" bgcolor=#fefefe
| 0 ||  || MBA-I || 17.7 || data-sort-value="0.86" | 860 m || multiple || 1999–2020 || 11 Dec 2020 || 101 || align=left | Disc.: SDSSAlt.: 2019 UD33 || 
|- id="1999 FM70" bgcolor=#fefefe
| 0 ||  || MBA-I || 18.77 || data-sort-value="0.52" | 520 m || multiple || 1999–2021 || 14 May 2021 || 43 || align=left | Disc.: SDSSAdded on 11 May 2021Alt.: 2010 GR138, 2021 GK56 || 
|- id="1999 FS70" bgcolor=#d6d6d6
| 0 ||  || MBA-O || 16.83 || 2.4 km || multiple || 1999–2021 || 14 Jul 2021 || 83 || align=left | Disc.: SDSSAlt.: 2015 HK23, 2017 OE33 || 
|- id="1999 FB71" bgcolor=#fefefe
| 0 ||  || MBA-I || 17.71 || data-sort-value="0.85" | 850 m || multiple || 1999–2021 || 03 Oct 2021 || 189 || align=left | Disc.: SDSSAlt.: 2006 DP124 || 
|- id="1999 FS71" bgcolor=#d6d6d6
| 0 ||  || MBA-O || 16.7 || 2.5 km || multiple || 1999–2021 || 08 Apr 2021 || 60 || align=left | Disc.: SDSSAdded on 11 May 2021 || 
|- id="1999 FD72" bgcolor=#fefefe
| 0 ||  || MBA-I || 17.79 || data-sort-value="0.82" | 820 m || multiple || 1999–2021 || 06 Dec 2021 || 138 || align=left | Disc.: SDSSAdded on 17 January 2021 || 
|- id="1999 FK72" bgcolor=#d6d6d6
| 1 ||  || MBA-O || 17.3 || 1.9 km || multiple || 1999–2020 || 05 Mar 2020 || 36 || align=left | Disc.: SDSSAdded on 22 July 2020 || 
|- id="1999 FP72" bgcolor=#d6d6d6
| 0 ||  || MBA-O || 17.02 || 2.2 km || multiple || 1999–2021 || 09 Aug 2021 || 68 || align=left | Disc.: SDSSAlt.: 2012 UP37 || 
|- id="1999 FU72" bgcolor=#E9E9E9
| 0 ||  || MBA-M || 17.3 || 1.9 km || multiple || 1999–2020 || 17 Dec 2020 || 87 || align=left | Disc.: SDSSAdded on 17 January 2021Alt.: 2015 VH38 || 
|- id="1999 FA73" bgcolor=#fefefe
| 0 ||  || MBA-I || 18.3 || data-sort-value="0.65" | 650 m || multiple || 1999–2018 || 21 Apr 2018 || 38 || align=left | Disc.: SDSSAlt.: 2014 DP88 || 
|- id="1999 FH73" bgcolor=#E9E9E9
| 0 ||  || MBA-M || 17.83 || 1.5 km || multiple || 1999–2022 || 27 Jan 2022 || 57 || align=left | Disc.: SDSSAdded on 17 January 2021Alt.: 2015 RB166 || 
|- id="1999 FT73" bgcolor=#d6d6d6
| 0 ||  || MBA-O || 16.5 || 2.8 km || multiple || 1999–2019 || 17 Dec 2019 || 56 || align=left | Disc.: SDSS || 
|- id="1999 FK74" bgcolor=#E9E9E9
| 0 ||  || MBA-M || 18.11 || data-sort-value="0.71" | 710 m || multiple || 1999–2021 || 09 Oct 2021 || 87 || align=left | Disc.: SDSSAdded on 22 July 2020 || 
|- id="1999 FL74" bgcolor=#d6d6d6
| 0 ||  || MBA-O || 16.8 || 2.4 km || multiple || 1996–2020 || 22 Apr 2020 || 74 || align=left | Disc.: SDSS || 
|- id="1999 FQ74" bgcolor=#fefefe
| 0 ||  || MBA-I || 18.2 || data-sort-value="0.68" | 680 m || multiple || 1999–2020 || 16 Dec 2020 || 51 || align=left | Disc.: SDSSAdded on 22 July 2020Alt.: 2010 GL192, 2018 GB9 || 
|- id="1999 FV74" bgcolor=#fefefe
| 0 ||  || MBA-I || 18.0 || data-sort-value="0.75" | 750 m || multiple || 1999–2020 || 02 Feb 2020 || 54 || align=left | Disc.: SDSSAdded on 22 July 2020Alt.: 2004 TR312 || 
|- id="1999 FT75" bgcolor=#d6d6d6
| 0 ||  || MBA-O || 16.9 || 2.3 km || multiple || 1999–2021 || 14 Jan 2021 || 77 || align=left | Disc.: SDSSAdded on 17 January 2021Alt.: 2016 CB150 || 
|- id="1999 FW75" bgcolor=#E9E9E9
| 0 ||  || MBA-M || 17.57 || data-sort-value="0.91" | 910 m || multiple || 1999–2021 || 05 Oct 2021 || 154 || align=left | Disc.: SDSS || 
|- id="1999 FB76" bgcolor=#E9E9E9
| 0 ||  || MBA-M || 17.3 || 1.5 km || multiple || 1999–2021 || 08 Jun 2021 || 129 || align=left | Disc.: SDSS || 
|- id="1999 FH76" bgcolor=#fefefe
| 0 ||  || MBA-I || 18.5 || data-sort-value="0.59" | 590 m || multiple || 1999–2020 || 22 Mar 2020 || 68 || align=left | Disc.: SDSSAlt.: 2006 DG188 || 
|- id="1999 FK77" bgcolor=#d6d6d6
| 0 ||  || MBA-O || 16.71 || 2.5 km || multiple || 1999–2021 || 03 May 2021 || 125 || align=left | Disc.: SDSSAlt.: 2010 LM152 || 
|- id="1999 FL77" bgcolor=#fefefe
| 0 ||  || MBA-I || 18.73 || data-sort-value="0.53" | 530 m || multiple || 1999–2021 || 30 Oct 2021 || 59 || align=left | Disc.: SDSSAdded on 5 November 2021 || 
|- id="1999 FQ77" bgcolor=#d6d6d6
| 0 ||  || MBA-O || 17.07 || 2.1 km || multiple || 1999–2021 || 30 Nov 2021 || 112 || align=left | Disc.: SDSSAdded on 22 July 2020Alt.: 2001 TY249, 2006 VR174 || 
|- id="1999 FE78" bgcolor=#fefefe
| 0 ||  || MBA-I || 18.2 || data-sort-value="0.68" | 680 m || multiple || 1999–2021 || 04 Jan 2021 || 62 || align=left | Disc.: SDSSAlt.: 2014 EG27 || 
|- id="1999 FK78" bgcolor=#fefefe
| 0 ||  || MBA-I || 18.7 || data-sort-value="0.54" | 540 m || multiple || 1999–2021 || 15 Apr 2021 || 40 || align=left | Disc.: SDSSAdded on 11 May 2021Alt.: 2021 EG6 || 
|- id="1999 FU78" bgcolor=#fefefe
| 0 ||  || MBA-I || 17.12 || 1.1 km || multiple || 1999–2022 || 27 Jan 2022 || 189 || align=left | Disc.: SDSS || 
|- id="1999 FL79" bgcolor=#E9E9E9
| 0 ||  || MBA-M || 18.4 || data-sort-value="0.62" | 620 m || multiple || 1999–2020 || 25 May 2020 || 30 || align=left | Disc.: SDSS || 
|- id="1999 FW79" bgcolor=#fefefe
| 0 ||  || MBA-I || 18.67 || data-sort-value="0.55" | 550 m || multiple || 1999–2021 || 04 Aug 2021 || 47 || align=left | Disc.: SDSSAdded on 22 July 2020 || 
|- id="1999 FE80" bgcolor=#E9E9E9
| 0 ||  || MBA-M || 17.52 || 1.3 km || multiple || 1999–2021 || 14 Apr 2021 || 52 || align=left | Disc.: SDSSAdded on 11 May 2021 || 
|- id="1999 FL80" bgcolor=#E9E9E9
| 0 ||  || MBA-M || 18.05 || 1.0 km || multiple || 1999–2021 || 11 May 2021 || 101 || align=left | Disc.: SDSSAlt.: 2012 BJ126 || 
|- id="1999 FN80" bgcolor=#fefefe
| 0 ||  || MBA-I || 18.9 || data-sort-value="0.49" | 490 m || multiple || 1999–2017 || 17 May 2017 || 22 || align=left | Disc.: SDSSAlt.: 2013 CD26 || 
|- id="1999 FS80" bgcolor=#E9E9E9
| 0 ||  || MBA-M || 17.82 || 1.1 km || multiple || 1999–2021 || 14 Jun 2021 || 38 || align=left | Disc.: SDSSAdded on 24 December 2021 || 
|- id="1999 FZ80" bgcolor=#d6d6d6
| 0 ||  || MBA-O || 16.2 || 3.2 km || multiple || 1999–2020 || 25 Nov 2020 || 95 || align=left | Disc.: SDSSAlt.: 2007 TR129 || 
|- id="1999 FO81" bgcolor=#E9E9E9
| 0 ||  || MBA-M || 17.0 || 1.7 km || multiple || 1999–2020 || 26 Apr 2020 || 67 || align=left | Disc.: SDSSAdded on 11 May 2021Alt.: 2014 XS50 || 
|- id="1999 FQ81" bgcolor=#fefefe
| 0 ||  || MBA-I || 18.51 || data-sort-value="0.59" | 590 m || multiple || 1999–2021 || 15 Sep 2021 || 44 || align=left | Disc.: SDSSAdded on 30 September 2021Alt.: 2014 QM560 || 
|- id="1999 FU81" bgcolor=#FA8072
| 0 ||  || MCA || 18.06 || data-sort-value="0.73" | 730 m || multiple || 1999–2021 || 07 Sep 2021 || 167 || align=left | Disc.: SDSSAlt.: 2014 QM143 || 
|- id="1999 FX81" bgcolor=#E9E9E9
| 0 ||  || MBA-M || 17.6 || 1.3 km || multiple || 1999–2016 || 10 May 2016 || 35 || align=left | Disc.: SDSSAdded on 22 July 2020 || 
|- id="1999 FG82" bgcolor=#fefefe
| 1 ||  || MBA-I || 17.6 || data-sort-value="0.90" | 900 m || multiple || 1999–2020 || 23 Dec 2020 || 60 || align=left | Disc.: SDSS || 
|- id="1999 FK82" bgcolor=#d6d6d6
| 0 ||  || MBA-O || 16.9 || 2.3 km || multiple || 1999–2020 || 17 Oct 2020 || 46 || align=left | Disc.: SDSSAdded on 17 January 2021Alt.: 2008 CY112 || 
|- id="1999 FK83" bgcolor=#E9E9E9
| 1 ||  || MBA-M || 17.4 || 1.4 km || multiple || 1999–2016 || 22 Apr 2016 || 51 || align=left | Disc.: SDSS || 
|- id="1999 FL83" bgcolor=#d6d6d6
| 0 ||  || MBA-O || 16.2 || 3.2 km || multiple || 1999–2021 || 07 Jun 2021 || 85 || align=left | Disc.: SDSSAdded on 11 May 2021 || 
|- id="1999 FS83" bgcolor=#d6d6d6
| 0 ||  || MBA-O || 17.10 || 2.1 km || multiple || 1999–2021 || 10 Aug 2021 || 82 || align=left | Disc.: SDSS || 
|- id="1999 FA84" bgcolor=#E9E9E9
| 0 ||  || MBA-M || 17.8 || 1.2 km || multiple || 1999–2021 || 04 Mar 2021 || 50 || align=left | Disc.: SDSSAdded on 9 March 2021 || 
|- id="1999 FH84" bgcolor=#d6d6d6
| 0 ||  || MBA-O || 15.7 || 4.0 km || multiple || 1999–2021 || 06 Mar 2021 || 158 || align=left | Disc.: SDSSAdded on 11 May 2021Alt.: 2003 YV42 || 
|- id="1999 FM84" bgcolor=#E9E9E9
| 0 ||  || MBA-M || 17.77 || 1.6 km || multiple || 1999–2022 || 27 Jan 2022 || 56 || align=left | Disc.: SDSSAdded on 9 March 2021Alt.: 2011 VS13, 2020 SQ13 || 
|- id="1999 FE85" bgcolor=#d6d6d6
| 0 ||  || MBA-O || 16.51 || 2.8 km || multiple || 1999–2022 || 27 Jan 2022 || 66 || align=left | Disc.: SDSSAlt.: 2016 CG163 || 
|- id="1999 FA86" bgcolor=#E9E9E9
| 0 ||  || MBA-M || 17.45 || 1.8 km || multiple || 1999–2022 || 27 Jan 2022 || 70 || align=left | Disc.: SDSSAdded on 17 January 2021Alt.: 2008 AH34 || 
|- id="1999 FM86" bgcolor=#fefefe
| 0 ||  || MBA-I || 18.41 || data-sort-value="0.62" | 620 m || multiple || 1999–2021 || 11 Jun 2021 || 89 || align=left | Disc.: SDSSAdded on 11 May 2021Alt.: 2021 GC34 || 
|- id="1999 FV86" bgcolor=#d6d6d6
| 0 ||  || MBA-O || 17.5 || 1.8 km || multiple || 1999–2020 || 22 Mar 2020 || 76 || align=left | Disc.: SDSSAdded on 22 July 2020 || 
|- id="1999 FA87" bgcolor=#fefefe
| 0 ||  || MBA-I || 17.74 || data-sort-value="0.84" | 840 m || multiple || 1999–2021 || 13 May 2021 || 150 || align=left | Disc.: SDSS || 
|- id="1999 FL87" bgcolor=#E9E9E9
| 2 ||  || MBA-M || 18.1 || 1.0 km || multiple || 1999–2017 || 01 May 2017 || 38 || align=left | Disc.: SDSS || 
|- id="1999 FN87" bgcolor=#E9E9E9
| 2 ||  || MBA-M || 18.5 || 1.1 km || multiple || 1999–2017 || 14 Feb 2017 || 20 || align=left | Disc.: SDSS || 
|- id="1999 FA88" bgcolor=#fefefe
| 0 ||  || MBA-I || 19.03 || data-sort-value="0.46" | 460 m || multiple || 1995–2021 || 15 Apr 2021 || 42 || align=left | Disc.: SDSSAdded on 11 May 2021Alt.: 2021 EB9 || 
|- id="1999 FL88" bgcolor=#d6d6d6
| 0 ||  || MBA-O || 17.17 || 2.0 km || multiple || 1999–2021 || 08 Sep 2021 || 112 || align=left | Disc.: SDSS || 
|- id="1999 FN88" bgcolor=#d6d6d6
| 0 ||  || MBA-O || 16.95 || 2.3 km || multiple || 1999–2021 || 13 Jun 2021 || 82 || align=left | Disc.: SDSS || 
|- id="1999 FY88" bgcolor=#d6d6d6
| 0 ||  || MBA-O || 16.7 || 2.5 km || multiple || 1999–2020 || 25 May 2020 || 99 || align=left | Disc.: SDSSAlt.: 2001 SE192 || 
|- id="1999 FV90" bgcolor=#E9E9E9
| 0 ||  || MBA-M || 17.6 || 1.7 km || multiple || 1999–2021 || 18 Jan 2021 || 36 || align=left | Disc.: SDSSAlt.: 2009 SG94 || 
|- id="1999 FA91" bgcolor=#fefefe
| 2 ||  || MBA-I || 18.96 || data-sort-value="0.48" | 480 m || multiple || 1999–2021 || 30 Jun 2021 || 19 || align=left | Disc.: SDSSAdded on 21 August 2021Alt.: 2021 JN35 || 
|- id="1999 FL91" bgcolor=#fefefe
| 0 ||  || MBA-I || 18.4 || data-sort-value="0.62" | 620 m || multiple || 1999–2021 || 19 Mar 2021 || 61 || align=left | Disc.: SDSSAdded on 11 May 2021Alt.: 2006 AA70 || 
|- id="1999 FN91" bgcolor=#d6d6d6
| 0 ||  || MBA-O || 16.36 || 3.0 km || multiple || 1999–2021 || 03 May 2021 || 77 || align=left | Disc.: SDSSAlt.: 2010 LN96, 2015 DZ112 || 
|- id="1999 FR91" bgcolor=#d6d6d6
| 0 ||  || MBA-O || 16.70 || 2.5 km || multiple || 1999–2021 || 13 Apr 2021 || 95 || align=left | Disc.: SDSSAlt.: 2015 AF240 || 
|- id="1999 FF92" bgcolor=#fefefe
| 0 ||  || MBA-I || 17.8 || data-sort-value="0.82" | 820 m || multiple || 1999–2021 || 06 Mar 2021 || 63 || align=left | Disc.: SDSSAdded on 9 March 2021Alt.: 2012 TJ136 || 
|- id="1999 FJ92" bgcolor=#d6d6d6
| 0 ||  || MBA-O || 17.0 || 2.2 km || multiple || 1999–2021 || 10 May 2021 || 40 || align=left | Disc.: SDSSAdded on 17 June 2021Alt.: 2015 EO22 || 
|- id="1999 FM92" bgcolor=#d6d6d6
| 0 ||  || MBA-O || 16.66 || 2.6 km || multiple || 1999–2021 || 15 Apr 2021 || 63 || align=left | Disc.: SDSSAdded on 11 May 2021Alt.: 2010 DH114 || 
|- id="1999 FR92" bgcolor=#d6d6d6
| 0 ||  || MBA-O || 16.83 || 2.4 km || multiple || 1999–2021 || 31 May 2021 || 121 || align=left | Disc.: SDSSAlt.: 2015 EE9 || 
|- id="1999 FV92" bgcolor=#d6d6d6
| 0 ||  || MBA-O || 16.0 || 3.5 km || multiple || 1999–2021 || 18 Jan 2021 || 149 || align=left | Disc.: SDSSAlt.: 2013 TT80 || 
|- id="1999 FA93" bgcolor=#E9E9E9
| 0 ||  || MBA-M || 17.27 || 1.0 km || multiple || 1999–2021 || 31 Oct 2021 || 115 || align=left | Disc.: SDSS || 
|- id="1999 FO93" bgcolor=#d6d6d6
| 0 ||  || MBA-O || 16.70 || 2.5 km || multiple || 1999–2021 || 20 Mar 2021 || 53 || align=left | Disc.: SDSSAdded on 30 September 2021Alt.: 2011 LO16, 2017 SR9 || 
|- id="1999 FC94" bgcolor=#E9E9E9
| 0 ||  || MBA-M || 18.27 || data-sort-value="0.93" | 930 m || multiple || 1999–2021 || 10 May 2021 || 46 || align=left | Disc.: SDSSAdded on 11 May 2021Alt.: 2016 AG61, 2021 GP40 || 
|- id="1999 FX94" bgcolor=#d6d6d6
| 0 ||  || MBA-O || 17.0 || 2.2 km || multiple || 1999–2020 || 27 Apr 2020 || 51 || align=left | Disc.: SDSSAdded on 17 January 2021Alt.: 2009 CH77, 2015 HT113 || 
|- id="1999 FF95" bgcolor=#d6d6d6
| 0 ||  || MBA-O || 16.1 || 3.4 km || multiple || 1999–2021 || 10 Jan 2021 || 119 || align=left | Disc.: SDSSAlt.: 2010 KK14 || 
|- id="1999 FH95" bgcolor=#d6d6d6
| 0 ||  || MBA-O || 15.7 || 4.0 km || multiple || 1999–2021 || 17 Jan 2021 || 183 || align=left | Disc.: SDSSAlt.: 2008 WK105, 2010 JE206, 2019 ON17 || 
|- id="1999 FJ95" bgcolor=#fefefe
| 0 ||  || MBA-I || 18.12 || data-sort-value="0.71" | 710 m || multiple || 1999–2021 || 30 Nov 2021 || 119 || align=left | Disc.: SDSSAlt.: 2009 BZ130 || 
|- id="1999 FK95" bgcolor=#fefefe
| 0 ||  || MBA-I || 18.63 || data-sort-value="0.56" | 560 m || multiple || 1999–2021 || 18 May 2021 || 48 || align=left | Disc.: SDSSAdded on 11 May 2021 || 
|- id="1999 FT95" bgcolor=#E9E9E9
| 0 ||  || MBA-M || 17.7 || 1.6 km || multiple || 1999–2019 || 03 Oct 2019 || 28 || align=left | Disc.: SDSSAdded on 22 July 2020 || 
|- id="1999 FS96" bgcolor=#E9E9E9
| 0 ||  || MBA-M || 17.50 || data-sort-value="0.94" | 940 m || multiple || 1999–2021 || 03 Dec 2021 || 77 || align=left | Disc.: SDSSAlt.: 2016 PO34 || 
|- id="1999 FZ96" bgcolor=#E9E9E9
| 0 ||  || MBA-M || 17.22 || 1.5 km || multiple || 1999–2021 || 27 Oct 2021 || 213 || align=left | Disc.: SpacewatchAlt.: 2004 RE125, 2013 TA154 || 
|- id="1999 FF97" bgcolor=#E9E9E9
| 0 ||  || MBA-M || 17.46 || 1.8 km || multiple || 1999–2022 || 26 Jan 2022 || 84 || align=left | Disc.: SpacewatchAlt.: 2014 OQ346 || 
|- id="1999 FK97" bgcolor=#fefefe
| 0 ||  || MBA-I || 18.72 || data-sort-value="0.54" | 540 m || multiple || 1996–2020 || 26 Oct 2020 || 99 || align=left | Disc.: SDSS || 
|- id="1999 FL97" bgcolor=#E9E9E9
| – ||  || MBA-M || 19.1 || data-sort-value="0.45" | 450 m || single || 2 days || 22 Mar 1999 || 6 || align=left | Disc.: SDSS || 
|- id="1999 FQ97" bgcolor=#fefefe
| 0 ||  || MBA-I || 18.32 || data-sort-value="0.64" | 640 m || multiple || 1999–2021 || 09 Nov 2021 || 78 || align=left | Disc.: SpacewatchAlt.: 2009 BJ54, 2016 DS20 || 
|- id="1999 FY97" bgcolor=#fefefe
| 0 ||  || MBA-I || 18.1 || data-sort-value="0.71" | 710 m || multiple || 1999–2019 || 14 Oct 2019 || 148 || align=left | Disc.: SDSS || 
|- id="1999 FA98" bgcolor=#E9E9E9
| 0 ||  || MBA-M || 17.06 || 2.2 km || multiple || 1999–2022 || 25 Jan 2022 || 142 || align=left | Disc.: SDSS || 
|- id="1999 FB98" bgcolor=#d6d6d6
| 0 ||  || MBA-O || 16.3 || 3.1 km || multiple || 1999–2020 || 19 May 2020 || 99 || align=left | Disc.: SDSS || 
|- id="1999 FC98" bgcolor=#d6d6d6
| 0 ||  || MBA-O || 16.87 || 2.4 km || multiple || 1999–2021 || 08 Sep 2021 || 106 || align=left | Disc.: SDSS || 
|- id="1999 FF98" bgcolor=#d6d6d6
| 0 ||  || MBA-O || 16.04 || 3.4 km || multiple || 1999–2021 || 01 Nov 2021 || 113 || align=left | Disc.: SDSSAlt.: 2010 CU230 || 
|- id="1999 FG98" bgcolor=#E9E9E9
| 0 ||  || MBA-M || 16.7 || 2.5 km || multiple || 1999–2021 || 15 Jan 2021 || 93 || align=left | Disc.: SDSS || 
|- id="1999 FH98" bgcolor=#d6d6d6
| 0 ||  || MBA-O || 16.65 || 2.6 km || multiple || 1995–2020 || 23 Jan 2020 || 85 || align=left | Disc.: SDSS || 
|- id="1999 FJ98" bgcolor=#E9E9E9
| 0 ||  || MBA-M || 17.54 || data-sort-value="0.92" | 920 m || multiple || 1999–2021 || 24 Nov 2021 || 166 || align=left | Disc.: SDSS || 
|- id="1999 FK98" bgcolor=#fefefe
| 0 ||  || MBA-I || 17.7 || data-sort-value="0.86" | 860 m || multiple || 1999–2021 || 17 Jan 2021 || 85 || align=left | Disc.: Spacewatch || 
|- id="1999 FL98" bgcolor=#fefefe
| 0 ||  || HUN || 18.44 || data-sort-value="0.61" | 610 m || multiple || 1999–2021 || 12 May 2021 || 95 || align=left | Disc.: SDSS || 
|- id="1999 FN98" bgcolor=#d6d6d6
| 0 ||  || MBA-O || 16.77 || 2.5 km || multiple || 1999–2021 || 07 Apr 2021 || 156 || align=left | Disc.: SDSS || 
|- id="1999 FO98" bgcolor=#d6d6d6
| 0 ||  = (619172) || MBA-O || 16.8 || 2.4 km || multiple || 1999–2020 || 26 May 2020 || 83 || align=left | Disc.: SDSS || 
|- id="1999 FP98" bgcolor=#d6d6d6
| 0 ||  || MBA-O || 16.7 || 2.5 km || multiple || 1999–2020 || 20 Apr 2020 || 67 || align=left | Disc.: SDSS || 
|- id="1999 FQ98" bgcolor=#fefefe
| 0 ||  || MBA-I || 18.83 || data-sort-value="0.51" | 510 m || multiple || 1999–2021 || 15 Apr 2021 || 72 || align=left | Disc.: SDSS || 
|- id="1999 FR98" bgcolor=#d6d6d6
| 0 ||  = (619173) || MBA-O || 16.8 || 2.4 km || multiple || 1999–2020 || 20 May 2020 || 67 || align=left | Disc.: SDSS || 
|- id="1999 FS98" bgcolor=#E9E9E9
| 0 ||  || MBA-M || 17.55 || data-sort-value="0.92" | 920 m || multiple || 1999–2021 || 14 Nov 2021 || 126 || align=left | Disc.: SDSSAlt.: 2010 CC238 || 
|- id="1999 FT98" bgcolor=#fefefe
| 0 ||  || MBA-I || 17.8 || data-sort-value="0.82" | 820 m || multiple || 1999–2019 || 27 Oct 2019 || 74 || align=left | Disc.: SDSS || 
|- id="1999 FU98" bgcolor=#d6d6d6
| 0 ||  || MBA-O || 16.72 || 2.5 km || multiple || 1999–2021 || 10 May 2021 || 84 || align=left | Disc.: SDSS || 
|- id="1999 FV98" bgcolor=#fefefe
| 0 ||  || MBA-I || 18.3 || data-sort-value="0.65" | 650 m || multiple || 1999–2020 || 05 Nov 2020 || 109 || align=left | Disc.: SDSS || 
|- id="1999 FW98" bgcolor=#d6d6d6
| 0 ||  || MBA-O || 16.36 || 3.0 km || multiple || 1999–2021 || 31 Jul 2021 || 97 || align=left | Disc.: Spacewatch || 
|- id="1999 FX98" bgcolor=#d6d6d6
| 0 ||  || MBA-O || 16.51 || 2.8 km || multiple || 1999–2021 || 10 Apr 2021 || 76 || align=left | Disc.: SDSSAlt.: 2010 LY85 || 
|- id="1999 FY98" bgcolor=#E9E9E9
| 0 ||  || MBA-M || 17.73 || 1.2 km || multiple || 1999–2021 || 08 Apr 2021 || 61 || align=left | Disc.: SpacewatchAlt.: 2008 HM39 || 
|- id="1999 FZ98" bgcolor=#fefefe
| 0 ||  || MBA-I || 18.5 || data-sort-value="0.59" | 590 m || multiple || 1999–2017 || 27 Apr 2017 || 56 || align=left | Disc.: SDSS || 
|- id="1999 FA99" bgcolor=#E9E9E9
| 0 ||  || MBA-M || 17.57 || 1.7 km || multiple || 1999–2021 || 17 Apr 2021 || 95 || align=left | Disc.: SDSS || 
|- id="1999 FB99" bgcolor=#fefefe
| 0 ||  || MBA-I || 18.74 || data-sort-value="0.53" | 530 m || multiple || 1999–2019 || 26 Jul 2019 || 71 || align=left | Disc.: SDSS || 
|- id="1999 FC99" bgcolor=#d6d6d6
| 0 ||  || MBA-O || 17.42 || 1.8 km || multiple || 1999–2021 || 02 Dec 2021 || 92 || align=left | Disc.: SDSS || 
|- id="1999 FD99" bgcolor=#d6d6d6
| 0 ||  || MBA-O || 17.26 || 2.0 km || multiple || 1999–2021 || 14 May 2021 || 86 || align=left | Disc.: SDSSAlt.: 2010 MG78 || 
|- id="1999 FE99" bgcolor=#E9E9E9
| 0 ||  || MBA-M || 17.17 || 1.1 km || multiple || 1999–2021 || 06 Nov 2021 || 117 || align=left | Disc.: Spacewatch || 
|- id="1999 FF99" bgcolor=#E9E9E9
| 0 ||  || MBA-M || 17.04 || 1.6 km || multiple || 1999–2021 || 09 Apr 2021 || 77 || align=left | Disc.: SDSS || 
|- id="1999 FG99" bgcolor=#E9E9E9
| 0 ||  || MBA-M || 17.53 || data-sort-value="0.93" | 930 m || multiple || 1999–2021 || 10 Sep 2021 || 58 || align=left | Disc.: SDSS || 
|- id="1999 FH99" bgcolor=#E9E9E9
| 0 ||  || MBA-M || 17.8 || 1.5 km || multiple || 1999–2019 || 28 Nov 2019 || 53 || align=left | Disc.: SDSS || 
|- id="1999 FJ99" bgcolor=#E9E9E9
| 0 ||  = (619174) || MBA-M || 17.7 || data-sort-value="0.86" | 860 m || multiple || 1999–2020 || 27 Apr 2020 || 54 || align=left | Disc.: SDSS || 
|- id="1999 FK99" bgcolor=#fefefe
| 0 ||  || MBA-I || 18.2 || data-sort-value="0.68" | 680 m || multiple || 1999–2021 || 12 Jun 2021 || 82 || align=left | Disc.: Spacewatch || 
|- id="1999 FL99" bgcolor=#fefefe
| 0 ||  || MBA-I || 18.5 || data-sort-value="0.59" | 590 m || multiple || 1999–2020 || 20 Oct 2020 || 89 || align=left | Disc.: Spacewatch || 
|- id="1999 FM99" bgcolor=#d6d6d6
| 0 ||  || MBA-O || 16.7 || 2.5 km || multiple || 1999–2021 || 21 Jan 2021 || 60 || align=left | Disc.: SDSS || 
|- id="1999 FN99" bgcolor=#d6d6d6
| 0 ||  || MBA-O || 16.59 || 2.7 km || multiple || 1999–2021 || 16 Nov 2021 || 148 || align=left | Disc.: SDSS || 
|- id="1999 FO99" bgcolor=#d6d6d6
| 0 ||  || MBA-O || 17.44 || 1.8 km || multiple || 1999–2021 || 07 Nov 2021 || 91 || align=left | Disc.: SDSS || 
|- id="1999 FP99" bgcolor=#E9E9E9
| 1 ||  || MBA-M || 18.31 || data-sort-value="0.65" | 650 m || multiple || 1999–2021 || 07 Nov 2021 || 52 || align=left | Disc.: SDSS || 
|- id="1999 FQ99" bgcolor=#fefefe
| 0 ||  || MBA-I || 18.1 || data-sort-value="0.71" | 710 m || multiple || 1999–2020 || 07 Dec 2020 || 57 || align=left | Disc.: SDSS || 
|- id="1999 FS99" bgcolor=#d6d6d6
| 0 ||  || MBA-O || 17.21 || 2.0 km || multiple || 1999–2021 || 28 Nov 2021 || 106 || align=left | Disc.: SDSS || 
|- id="1999 FT99" bgcolor=#E9E9E9
| 0 ||  || MBA-M || 17.9 || 1.5 km || multiple || 1999–2017 || 11 Aug 2017 || 42 || align=left | Disc.: SDSS || 
|- id="1999 FU99" bgcolor=#E9E9E9
| 0 ||  || MBA-M || 17.3 || 1.5 km || multiple || 1999–2020 || 16 Feb 2020 || 64 || align=left | Disc.: SDSSAlt.: 2016 AJ157 || 
|- id="1999 FV99" bgcolor=#E9E9E9
| 0 ||  || MBA-M || 17.44 || 1.4 km || multiple || 1999–2021 || 13 Jun 2021 || 106 || align=left | Disc.: SDSSAlt.: 2014 UK253 || 
|- id="1999 FW99" bgcolor=#fefefe
| 1 ||  || MBA-I || 18.3 || data-sort-value="0.65" | 650 m || multiple || 1999–2018 || 18 Aug 2018 || 38 || align=left | Disc.: SDSS || 
|- id="1999 FY99" bgcolor=#fefefe
| 0 ||  = (619175) || MBA-I || 18.4 || data-sort-value="0.62" | 620 m || multiple || 1999–2020 || 04 Jan 2020 || 46 || align=left | Disc.: SDSS || 
|- id="1999 FZ99" bgcolor=#fefefe
| 0 ||  || MBA-I || 18.9 || data-sort-value="0.49" | 490 m || multiple || 1999–2021 || 04 Jan 2021 || 50 || align=left | Disc.: SDSS || 
|- id="1999 FA100" bgcolor=#d6d6d6
| 0 ||  || MBA-O || 16.77 || 2.5 km || multiple || 1999–2021 || 15 May 2021 || 58 || align=left | Disc.: Spacewatch || 
|- id="1999 FB100" bgcolor=#fefefe
| 0 ||  || HUN || 18.67 || data-sort-value="0.55" | 550 m || multiple || 1999–2022 || 05 Jan 2022 || 106 || align=left | Disc.: SDSS || 
|- id="1999 FC100" bgcolor=#fefefe
| 0 ||  || MBA-I || 18.4 || data-sort-value="0.62" | 620 m || multiple || 1999–2020 || 22 Jun 2020 || 63 || align=left | Disc.: SDSSAlt.: 2010 KP56 || 
|- id="1999 FD100" bgcolor=#fefefe
| 0 ||  || MBA-I || 18.07 || data-sort-value="0.72" | 720 m || multiple || 1999–2021 || 27 Oct 2021 || 119 || align=left | Disc.: SDSS || 
|- id="1999 FF100" bgcolor=#E9E9E9
| 0 ||  || MBA-M || 17.50 || data-sort-value="0.94" | 940 m || multiple || 1999–2021 || 30 Oct 2021 || 87 || align=left | Disc.: SDSS || 
|- id="1999 FG100" bgcolor=#d6d6d6
| 0 ||  || MBA-O || 16.9 || 2.3 km || multiple || 1999–2020 || 21 Mar 2020 || 59 || align=left | Disc.: SDSS || 
|- id="1999 FJ100" bgcolor=#E9E9E9
| 0 ||  || MBA-M || 17.4 || 1.4 km || multiple || 1999–2020 || 12 Apr 2020 || 85 || align=left | Disc.: SDSS || 
|- id="1999 FK100" bgcolor=#fefefe
| 0 ||  || HUN || 19.62 || data-sort-value="0.35" | 350 m || multiple || 1999–2021 || 15 Apr 2021 || 40 || align=left | Disc.: SDSS || 
|- id="1999 FL100" bgcolor=#fefefe
| 1 ||  || MBA-I || 19.1 || data-sort-value="0.45" | 450 m || multiple || 1999–2020 || 22 Apr 2020 || 55 || align=left | Disc.: SDSS || 
|- id="1999 FM100" bgcolor=#fefefe
| 0 ||  || MBA-I || 18.2 || data-sort-value="0.68" | 680 m || multiple || 1999–2021 || 18 Jan 2021 || 61 || align=left | Disc.: Spacewatch || 
|- id="1999 FN100" bgcolor=#fefefe
| 0 ||  || MBA-I || 16.9 || 1.2 km || multiple || 1999–2021 || 18 Jan 2021 || 76 || align=left | Disc.: SDSSAlt.: 2010 HT19 || 
|- id="1999 FO100" bgcolor=#d6d6d6
| 0 ||  || MBA-O || 16.4 || 2.9 km || multiple || 1999–2020 || 24 Mar 2020 || 69 || align=left | Disc.: SDSSAlt.: 2009 BP213 || 
|- id="1999 FP100" bgcolor=#d6d6d6
| 0 ||  || MBA-O || 16.52 || 2.8 km || multiple || 1999–2021 || 14 Apr 2021 || 85 || align=left | Disc.: SDSS || 
|- id="1999 FQ100" bgcolor=#d6d6d6
| 0 ||  || MBA-O || 16.7 || 2.5 km || multiple || 1999–2020 || 17 May 2020 || 84 || align=left | Disc.: SDSS || 
|- id="1999 FR100" bgcolor=#d6d6d6
| 0 ||  || MBA-O || 16.61 || 2.7 km || multiple || 1999–2021 || 11 May 2021 || 81 || align=left | Disc.: SDSS || 
|- id="1999 FS100" bgcolor=#d6d6d6
| 0 ||  || MBA-O || 16.66 || 2.6 km || multiple || 1993–2021 || 03 May 2021 || 95 || align=left | Disc.: SDSS || 
|- id="1999 FT100" bgcolor=#d6d6d6
| 0 ||  || MBA-O || 16.93 || 2.3 km || multiple || 1999–2021 || 08 May 2021 || 73 || align=left | Disc.: SDSS || 
|- id="1999 FV100" bgcolor=#E9E9E9
| 0 ||  || MBA-M || 17.21 || 1.1 km || multiple || 1999–2021 || 17 Jul 2021 || 68 || align=left | Disc.: SDSSAlt.: 2005 TW17 || 
|- id="1999 FW100" bgcolor=#fefefe
| 0 ||  || MBA-I || 18.47 || data-sort-value="0.60" | 600 m || multiple || 1999–2021 || 04 Oct 2021 || 93 || align=left | Disc.: SDSS || 
|- id="1999 FX100" bgcolor=#d6d6d6
| 0 ||  || MBA-O || 16.7 || 2.5 km || multiple || 1999–2021 || 17 Feb 2021 || 59 || align=left | Disc.: SDSSAlt.: 2007 TQ498 || 
|- id="1999 FY100" bgcolor=#E9E9E9
| 0 ||  || MBA-M || 17.5 || 1.8 km || multiple || 1999–2018 || 05 Oct 2018 || 38 || align=left | Disc.: SDSS || 
|- id="1999 FZ100" bgcolor=#fefefe
| 0 ||  || MBA-I || 17.99 || data-sort-value="0.75" | 750 m || multiple || 1999–2021 || 03 Oct 2021 || 84 || align=left | Disc.: SDSS || 
|- id="1999 FA101" bgcolor=#fefefe
| 0 ||  || HUN || 18.4 || data-sort-value="0.62" | 620 m || multiple || 1999–2020 || 16 Nov 2020 || 74 || align=left | Disc.: SDSS || 
|- id="1999 FB101" bgcolor=#E9E9E9
| 0 ||  || MBA-M || 17.1 || 1.6 km || multiple || 1999–2020 || 25 Jan 2020 || 36 || align=left | Disc.: SDSS || 
|- id="1999 FC101" bgcolor=#d6d6d6
| 0 ||  || MBA-O || 17.1 || 2.1 km || multiple || 1999–2020 || 26 Apr 2020 || 55 || align=left | Disc.: SDSS || 
|- id="1999 FD101" bgcolor=#d6d6d6
| 0 ||  || MBA-O || 17.3 || 1.9 km || multiple || 1999–2020 || 16 May 2020 || 67 || align=left | Disc.: SDSS || 
|- id="1999 FE101" bgcolor=#fefefe
| 0 ||  || MBA-I || 18.3 || data-sort-value="0.65" | 650 m || multiple || 1999–2020 || 15 Sep 2020 || 56 || align=left | Disc.: SDSS || 
|- id="1999 FF101" bgcolor=#E9E9E9
| 0 ||  || MBA-M || 17.7 || 1.6 km || multiple || 1999–2018 || 10 Nov 2018 || 39 || align=left | Disc.: SDSS || 
|- id="1999 FG101" bgcolor=#E9E9E9
| 0 ||  || MBA-M || 17.1 || 2.1 km || multiple || 1999–2021 || 06 Jan 2021 || 89 || align=left | Disc.: SDSS || 
|- id="1999 FH101" bgcolor=#E9E9E9
| 1 ||  || MBA-M || 18.2 || data-sort-value="0.96" | 960 m || multiple || 1999–2017 || 13 Jun 2017 || 33 || align=left | Disc.: SDSS || 
|- id="1999 FK101" bgcolor=#E9E9E9
| 1 ||  || MBA-M || 18.56 || data-sort-value="0.58" | 580 m || multiple || 1999–2021 || 26 Nov 2021 || 43 || align=left | Disc.: No observationsAdded on 19 October 2020 || 
|- id="1999 FM101" bgcolor=#d6d6d6
| 0 ||  || MBA-O || 17.37 || 1.9 km || multiple || 1999–2021 || 14 Apr 2021 || 33 || align=left | Disc.: SDSSAdded on 21 August 2021 || 
|- id="1999 FO101" bgcolor=#d6d6d6
| 0 ||  || MBA-O || 17.16 || 2.1 km || multiple || 1999–2022 || 27 Apr 2022 || 87 || align=left | Disc.: LONEOSAdded on 29 January 2022 || 8
|}
back to top

G 

|- id="1999 GL4" bgcolor=#FFC2E0
| 5 ||  || APO || 19.7 || data-sort-value="0.41" | 410 m || multiple || 1998–1999 || 22 May 1999 || 46 || align=left | Disc.: LINEARPotentially hazardous object || 
|- id="1999 GR6" bgcolor=#FFC2E0
| 3 ||  || APO || 20.0 || data-sort-value="0.36" | 360 m || multiple || 1999–2013 || 14 Apr 2013 || 54 || align=left | Disc.: LINEAR || 
|- id="1999 GW12" bgcolor=#fefefe
| 0 ||  || MBA-I || 18.8 || data-sort-value="0.52" | 520 m || multiple || 1999–2020 || 20 Oct 2020 || 63 || align=left | Disc.: Spacewatch || 
|- id="1999 GF13" bgcolor=#fefefe
| 0 ||  || MBA-I || 18.05 || data-sort-value="0.73" | 730 m || multiple || 1999–2021 || 13 May 2021 || 88 || align=left | Disc.: SpacewatchAdded on 11 May 2021Alt.: 2006 BH60, 2010 GD209 || 
|- id="1999 GU14" bgcolor=#fefefe
| 0 ||  || MBA-I || 18.36 || data-sort-value="0.63" | 630 m || multiple || 1999–2021 || 30 Oct 2021 || 133 || align=left | Disc.: SpacewatchAlt.: 2016 CG219 || 
|- id="1999 GS46" bgcolor=#C2E0FF
| 3 ||  || TNO || 6.9 || 214 km || multiple || 1999–2016 || 29 May 2016 || 34 || align=left | Disc.: La Silla Obs.LoUTNOs, cubewano (hot), BR-mag: 1.76 || 
|- id="1999 GO55" bgcolor=#d6d6d6
| 0 ||  || MBA-O || 16.30 || 3.1 km || multiple || 1999–2021 || 08 May 2021 || 137 || align=left | Disc.: SpacewatchAlt.: 2015 BA283 || 
|- id="1999 GA64" bgcolor=#fefefe
| 0 ||  || MBA-I || 17.9 || data-sort-value="0.78" | 780 m || multiple || 1999–2021 || 15 Jan 2021 || 72 || align=left | Disc.: SpacewatchAlt.: 2010 EB92 || 
|- id="1999 GB64" bgcolor=#E9E9E9
| 0 ||  || MBA-M || 16.59 || 2.0 km || multiple || 1999–2021 || 08 Aug 2021 || 107 || align=left | Disc.: Spacewatch || 
|- id="1999 GC64" bgcolor=#d6d6d6
| 0 ||  || MBA-O || 16.80 || 2.4 km || multiple || 1999–2021 || 09 May 2021 || 114 || align=left | Disc.: Spacewatch || 
|- id="1999 GD64" bgcolor=#E9E9E9
| 0 ||  || MBA-M || 17.12 || 1.6 km || multiple || 1999–2021 || 15 May 2021 || 74 || align=left | Disc.: Spacewatch || 
|- id="1999 GE64" bgcolor=#fefefe
| 1 ||  || MBA-I || 18.8 || data-sort-value="0.52" | 520 m || multiple || 1999–2017 || 18 Aug 2017 || 27 || align=left | Disc.: No observationsAdded on 19 October 2020 || 
|}
back to top

H 

|- id="1999 HC1" bgcolor=#FFC2E0
| 7 ||  || APO || 24.5 || data-sort-value="0.045" | 45 m || single || 5 days || 21 Apr 1999 || 11 || align=left | Disc.: LINEARAMO at MPC || 
|- id="1999 HV1" bgcolor=#FFC2E0
| 1 ||  || AMO || 17.4 || 1.2 km || multiple || 1991–2021 || 15 Jan 2021 || 144 || align=left | Disc.: SpacewatchNEO larger than 1 kilometer || 
|- id="1999 HW1" bgcolor=#FFC2E0
| 0 ||  || AMO || 20.05 || data-sort-value="0.35" | 350 m || multiple || 1999–2021 || 11 May 2021 || 201 || align=left | Disc.: LINEAR || 
|- id="1999 HX1" bgcolor=#FFC2E0
| 1 ||  || AMO || 19.9 || data-sort-value="0.37" | 370 m || multiple || 1999–2003 || 31 Jul 2003 || 108 || align=left | Disc.: LINEAR || 
|- id="1999 HH7" bgcolor=#fefefe
| 0 ||  || MBA-I || 18.16 || data-sort-value="0.69" | 690 m || multiple || 1999–2020 || 28 Apr 2020 || 52 || align=left | Disc.: SpacewatchAdded on 11 May 2021Alt.: 2006 JU88 || 
|- id="1999 HS11" bgcolor=#C2E0FF
| 3 ||  || TNO || 6.9 || 139 km || multiple || 1999–2014 || 25 Apr 2014 || 33 || align=left | Disc.: Kitt PeakLoUTNOs, cubewano (cold), BR-mag: 1.76; taxonomy: RR || 
|- id="1999 HV11" bgcolor=#C2E0FF
| 3 ||  || TNO || 7.8 || 92 km || multiple || 1999–2013 || 14 May 2013 || 29 || align=left | Disc.: Kitt PeakLoUTNOs, cubewano (cold), BR-mag: 1.70 || 
|- id="1999 HY11" bgcolor=#C2E0FF
| E ||  || TNO || 8.3 || 75 km || single || 20 days || 07 May 1999 || 6 || align=left | Disc.: Kitt PeakLoUTNOs, cubewano? || 
|- id="1999 HZ11" bgcolor=#C2E0FF
| E ||  || TNO || 8.4 || 72 km || single || 20 days || 07 May 1999 || 5 || align=left | Disc.: Kitt PeakLoUTNOs, cubewano? || 
|- id="1999 HA12" bgcolor=#C2E0FF
| E ||  || TNO || 7.8 || 95 km || single || 50 days || 06 Jun 1999 || 8 || align=left | Disc.: Kitt PeakLoUTNOs, cubewano? || 
|- id="1999 HD12" bgcolor=#C7FF8F
| 8 ||  || CEN || 12.8 || 15 km || single || 50 days || 05 Jun 1999 || 11 || align=left | Disc.: Kitt Peak || 
|- id="1999 HG12" bgcolor=#C2E0FF
| 3 ||  || TNO || 7.2 || 131 km || multiple || 1999–2013 || 14 Mar 2013 || 23 || align=left | Disc.: Kitt PeakLoUTNOs, res4:7, BR-mag: 1.61; taxonomy: IR-RR || 
|- id="1999 HH12" bgcolor=#C2E0FF
| 3 ||  || TNO || 7.0 || 132 km || multiple || 1999–2015 || 22 May 2015 || 25 || align=left | Disc.: Kitt PeakLoUTNOs, cubewano (cold) || 
|- id="1999 HJ12" bgcolor=#C2E0FF
| 3 ||  || TNO || 7.4 || 110 km || multiple || 1999–2015 || 15 Apr 2015 || 29 || align=left | Disc.: Kitt PeakLoUTNOs, cubewano (cold) || 
|- id="1999 HH13" bgcolor=#fefefe
| 0 ||  || MBA-I || 18.02 || data-sort-value="0.74" | 740 m || multiple || 1999–2022 || 25 Jan 2022 || 133 || align=left | Disc.: Spacewatch || 
|- id="1999 HJ13" bgcolor=#E9E9E9
| 0 ||  || MBA-M || 16.91 || 1.2 km || multiple || 1999–2022 || 06 Jan 2022 || 147 || align=left | Disc.: Spacewatch || 
|- id="1999 HK13" bgcolor=#fefefe
| 0 ||  || MBA-I || 18.52 || data-sort-value="0.59" | 590 m || multiple || 1999–2019 || 26 Jul 2019 || 102 || align=left | Disc.: Spacewatch || 
|- id="1999 HL13" bgcolor=#E9E9E9
| 0 ||  || MBA-M || 18.07 || 1.0 km || multiple || 1999–2021 || 04 Aug 2021 || 89 || align=left | Disc.: Spacewatch || 
|- id="1999 HM13" bgcolor=#d6d6d6
| 0 ||  || MBA-O || 16.4 || 2.9 km || multiple || 1999–2018 || 08 Nov 2018 || 48 || align=left | Disc.: Spacewatch || 
|- id="1999 HO13" bgcolor=#E9E9E9
| 0 ||  || MBA-M || 17.44 || data-sort-value="0.97" | 970 m || multiple || 1999–2021 || 02 Dec 2021 || 53 || align=left | Disc.: Spacewatch || 
|}
back to top

J 

|- id="1999 JZ10" bgcolor=#FFC2E0
| 7 ||  || APO || 21.8 || data-sort-value="0.16" | 160 m || single || 20 days || 03 Jun 1999 || 51 || align=left | Disc.: LINEARPotentially hazardous object || 
|- id="1999 JE16" bgcolor=#fefefe
| 0 ||  || MBA-I || 18.71 || data-sort-value="0.54" | 540 m || multiple || 1999–2022 || 05 Jan 2022 || 69 || align=left | Disc.: Spacewatch || 
|- id="1999 JV127" bgcolor=#C7FF8F
| E ||  || CEN || 10.4 || 46 km || single || 8 days || 18 May 1999 || 44 || align=left | Disc.: Cerro Tololo || 
|- id="1999 JA132" bgcolor=#C2E0FF
| – ||  || TNO || 7.7 || 99 km || single || 59 days || 19 May 1999 || 41 || align=left | Disc.: Cerro TololoLoUTNOs, cubewano? || 
|- id="1999 JB132" bgcolor=#C2E0FF
| E ||  || TNO || 8.2 || 108 km || single || 8 days || 18 May 1999 || 25 || align=left | Disc.: Cerro TololoLoUTNOs, plutino? || 
|- id="1999 JC132" bgcolor=#C2E0FF
| E ||  || TNO || 8.7 || 86 km || single || 1 day || 11 May 1999 || 24 || align=left | Disc.: Cerro TololoLoUTNOs, plutino? || 
|- id="1999 JD132" bgcolor=#C2E0FF
| 3 ||  || TNO || 7.7 || 148 km || multiple || 1999–2018 || 10 Apr 2018 || 67 || align=left | Disc.: Cerro TololoLoUTNOs, cubewano (hot), BR-mag: 1.59 || 
|- id="1999 JE132" bgcolor=#C2E0FF
| E ||  || TNO || 8.6 || 90 km || single || 9 days || 19 May 1999 || 55 || align=left | Disc.: Cerro TololoLoUTNOs, plutino? || 
|- id="1999 JF132" bgcolor=#C2E0FF
| E ||  || TNO || 7.9 || 90 km || single || 9 days || 19 May 1999 || 37 || align=left | Disc.: Cerro TololoLoUTNOs, cubewano? || 
|- id="1999 JH132" bgcolor=#C2E0FF
| E ||  || TNO || 9.6 || 41 km || single || 9 days || 19 May 1999 || 4 || align=left | Disc.: Cerro TololoLoUTNOs, cubewano? || 
|- id="1999 JJ132" bgcolor=#C2E0FF
| E ||  || TNO || 8.8 || 60 km || single || 9 days || 19 May 1999 || 4 || align=left | Disc.: Cerro TololoLoUTNOs, cubewano? || 
|- id="1999 JK132" bgcolor=#C2E0FF
| E ||  || TNO || 9.2 || 68 km || single || 9 days || 19 May 1999 || 4 || align=left | Disc.: Cerro TololoLoUTNOs, plutino? || 
|}
back to top

K 

|- id="1999 KL1" bgcolor=#FFC2E0
| 7 ||  || APO || 21.5 || data-sort-value="0.18" | 180 m || single || 16 days || 02 Jun 1999 || 26 || align=left | Disc.: LINEAR || 
|- id="1999 KJ6" bgcolor=#FA8072
| 1 ||  || MCA || 18.4 || 1.2 km || multiple || 1999–2020 || 24 Jun 2020 || 68 || align=left | Disc.: LINEARAdded on 13 September 2020Alt.: 2010 NO142 || 
|- id="1999 KB9" bgcolor=#fefefe
| 0 ||  || MBA-I || 16.9 || 1.2 km || multiple || 1999–2021 || 10 Jan 2021 || 144 || align=left | Disc.: LINEARAlt.: 2015 VO4 || 
|- id="1999 KT16" bgcolor=#C2E0FF
| E ||  || TNO || 8.8 || 60 km || single || 1 day || 19 May 1999 || 4 || align=left | Disc.: Cerro TololoLoUTNOs, cubewano? || 
|- id="1999 KK17" bgcolor=#C2E0FF
| E ||  || TNO || 8.8 || 60 km || single || 9 days || 19 May 1999 || 5 || align=left | Disc.: Cerro TololoLoUTNOs, cubewano? || 
|- id="1999 KL17" bgcolor=#C2E0FF
| E ||  || TNO || 8.7 || 62 km || single || 90 days || 08 Aug 1999 || 13 || align=left | Disc.: Cerro TololoLoUTNOs, cubewano? || 
|- id="1999 KR18" bgcolor=#C2E0FF
| 5 ||  || TNO || 7.9 || 95 km || multiple || 1999–2001 || 15 Nov 2001 || 21 || align=left | Disc.: Cerro TololoLoUTNOs, res4:7 || 
|- id="1999 KC21" bgcolor=#E9E9E9
| 0 ||  || MBA-M || 17.7 || data-sort-value="0.86" | 860 m || multiple || 1999–2020 || 16 Oct 2020 || 105 || align=left | Disc.: Spacewatch || 
|- id="1999 KN21" bgcolor=#E9E9E9
| 0 ||  || MBA-M || 17.27 || 1.5 km || multiple || 1999–2021 || 28 Oct 2021 || 76 || align=left | Disc.: Spacewatch || 
|- id="1999 KO21" bgcolor=#fefefe
| 0 ||  || MBA-I || 18.30 || data-sort-value="0.65" | 650 m || multiple || 1999–2021 || 11 May 2021 || 73 || align=left | Disc.: Spacewatch || 
|- id="1999 KR21" bgcolor=#fefefe
| 0 ||  || MBA-I || 18.3 || data-sort-value="0.65" | 650 m || multiple || 1999–2020 || 11 Oct 2020 || 67 || align=left | Disc.: Spacewatch || 
|}
back to top

L 

|- id="1999 LJ1" bgcolor=#FFC2E0
| 7 ||  || AMO || 22.2 || data-sort-value="0.13" | 130 m || single || 28 days || 02 Jul 1999 || 41 || align=left | Disc.: CSS || 
|- id="1999 LT1" bgcolor=#FFC2E0
| 1 ||  || AMO || 17.6 || 1.1 km || multiple || 1999–2003 || 26 Dec 2003 || 64 || align=left | Disc.: LINEARNEO larger than 1 kilometer || 
|- id="1999 LW1" bgcolor=#FFC2E0
| 2 ||  || APO || 20.3 || data-sort-value="0.31" | 310 m || multiple || 1999–2018 || 10 Jun 2018 || 70 || align=left | Disc.: CSS || 
|- id="1999 LX1" bgcolor=#FFC2E0
| 9 ||  || APO || 20.6 || data-sort-value="0.27" | 270 m || single || 6 days || 14 Jun 1999 || 42 || align=left | Disc.: LINEARPotentially hazardous object || 
|- id="1999 LD6" bgcolor=#FFC2E0
| 8 ||  || APO || 22.1 || data-sort-value="0.14" | 140 m || single || 3 days || 13 Jun 1999 || 12 || align=left | Disc.: LINEAR || 
|- id="1999 LE6" bgcolor=#FFC2E0
| 1 ||  || AMO || 20.7 || data-sort-value="0.26" | 260 m || multiple || 1999–2020 || 12 Jun 2020 || 83 || align=left | Disc.: LINEAR || 
|- id="1999 LE7" bgcolor=#E9E9E9
| 0 ||  || MBA-M || 17.9 || 1.1 km || multiple || 1999–2021 || 07 Nov 2021 || 47 || align=left | Disc.: SpacewatchAdded on 29 January 2022 || 
|- id="1999 LV7" bgcolor=#FFC2E0
| 0 ||  || AMO || 19.39 || data-sort-value="0.51" | 490 m || multiple || 1999-2022 || 09 May 2022 || 105 || align=left | Disc.: LINEAR || 
|- id="1999 LW29" bgcolor=#E9E9E9
| 0 ||  || MBA-M || 17.75 || data-sort-value="0.84" | 840 m || multiple || 1999–2021 || 06 Nov 2021 || 79 || align=left | Disc.: Spacewatch || 
|- id="1999 LD30" bgcolor=#FFC2E0
| 1 ||  || AMO || 20.3 || data-sort-value="0.31" | 310 m || multiple || 1999–2004 || 10 Oct 2004 || 71 || align=left | Disc.: LINEAR || 
|- id="1999 LC31" bgcolor=#E9E9E9
| 2 ||  || MBA-M || 17.9 || data-sort-value="0.78" | 780 m || multiple || 1999–2015 || 09 Jul 2015 || 36 || align=left | Disc.: SpacewatchAdded on 17 January 2021Alt.: 2015 MA1 || 
|- id="1999 LE31" bgcolor=#C7FF8F
| 0 ||  || CEN || 12.68 || 17 km || multiple || 1999–2021 || 07 Jul 2021 || 171 || align=left | Disc.: LINEAR, albedo: 0.056; BR-mag: 1.20 || 
|- id="1999 LB37" bgcolor=#C2E0FF
| E ||  || TNO || 9.6 || 57 km || single || 1 day || 09 Jun 1999 || 4 || align=left | Disc.: Palomar Obs.LoUTNOs, plutino? || 
|- id="1999 LE37" bgcolor=#fefefe
| 1 ||  || MBA-I || 18.0 || data-sort-value="0.75" | 750 m || multiple || 1999–2019 || 16 Jan 2019 || 40 || align=left | Disc.: Spacewatch || 
|- id="1999 LF37" bgcolor=#fefefe
| 0 ||  = (619176) || MBA-I || 18.2 || data-sort-value="0.68" | 680 m || multiple || 1999–2018 || 04 Nov 2018 || 76 || align=left | Disc.: Spacewatch || 
|}
back to top

N 

|- id="1999 NX" bgcolor=#d6d6d6
| 0 || 1999 NX || MBA-O || 16.13 || 3.3 km || multiple || 1999–2021 || 07 Jun 2021 || 148 || align=left | Disc.: Woomera Obs.Alt.: 2015 BN300 || 
|- id="1999 NW2" bgcolor=#FFC2E0
| 1 ||  || APO || 23.2 || data-sort-value="0.081" | 81 m || multiple || 1999–2019 || 05 Apr 2019 || 164 || align=left | Disc.: LINEAR || 
|- id="1999 NY4" bgcolor=#FA8072
| 0 ||  || MCA || 19.18 || data-sort-value="0.47" | 470 m || multiple || 1999–2022 || 22 Oct 2022 || 75 || align=left | Disc.: LINEARAlt.: 2012 KR50 || 
|- id="1999 NZ4" bgcolor=#FA8072
| 3 ||  || MCA || 17.6 || 1.7 km || single || 97 days || 18 Oct 1999 || 142 || align=left | Disc.: LINEAR || 
|}
back to top

O 

|- id="1999 OQ3" bgcolor=#FFC2E0
| 1 ||  || AMO || 20.1 || data-sort-value="0.34" | 340 m || multiple || 1999–2012 || 03 Oct 2012 || 86 || align=left | Disc.: LINEAR || 
|- id="1999 OZ3" bgcolor=#C2E0FF
| 5 ||  || TNO || 7.4 || 110 km || multiple || 1999–2022 || 27 Aug 2022 || 32 || align=left | Disc.: Mauna Kea Obs.LoUTNOs, cubewano (cold) || 
|- id="1999 OA4" bgcolor=#C2E0FF
| 3 ||  || TNO || 7.9 || 87 km || multiple || 1999–2006 || 24 Jul 2006 || 27 || align=left | Disc.: Mauna Kea Obs.LoUTNOs, cubewano (cold) || 
|- id="1999 OC4" bgcolor=#C2E0FF
| 4 ||  || TNO || 8.3 || 73 km || multiple || 1999–2001 || 25 Jul 2001 || 24 || align=left | Disc.: Mauna Kea Obs.LoUTNOs, cubewano (cold) || 
|- id="1999 OD4" bgcolor=#C2E0FF
| 4 ||  || TNO || 7.21 || 124 km || multiple || 1999–2021 || 12 Sep 2021 || 44 || align=left | Disc.: Mauna Kea Obs.LoUTNOs, cubewano? || 
|- id="1999 OG4" bgcolor=#C2E0FF
| 5 ||  || TNO || 7.7 || 96 km || multiple || 1999–2001 || 27 Jul 2001 || 18 || align=left | Disc.: Mauna Kea Obs.LoUTNOs, cubewano (cold) || 
|- id="1999 OH4" bgcolor=#C2E0FF
| 3 ||  || TNO || 8.3 || 91 km || multiple || 1999–2006 || 03 Aug 2006 || 22 || align=left | Disc.: Mauna Kea Obs.LoUTNOs, other TNO, BR-mag: 3.20 || 
|- id="1999 OJ4" bgcolor=#C2E0FF
| 4 ||  || TNO || 7.1 || 75 km || multiple || 1999–2022 || 27 Aug 2022 || 66 || align=left | Disc.: Mauna Kea Obs.LoUTNOs, other TNO, albedo: 0.225; BR-mag: 1.68; taxonomy: RR; binary: 72 km || 
|- id="1999 OK4" bgcolor=#C2E0FF
| 4 ||  || TNO || 7.6 || 126 km || multiple || 1999–2003 || 09 Jul 2003 || 20 || align=left | Disc.: Mauna Kea Obs.LoUTNOs, other TNO || 
|- id="1999 ON5" bgcolor=#fefefe
| 0 ||  || MBA-I || 17.27 || 1.0 km || multiple || 1999–2022 || 07 Jan 2022 || 176 || align=left | Disc.: SpacewatchAlt.: 2003 SF390, 2017 RJ68 || 
|- id="1999 OW5" bgcolor=#E9E9E9
| 0 ||  || MBA-M || 17.31 || 1.5 km || multiple || 1999–2021 || 11 Oct 2021 || 120 || align=left | Disc.: Spacewatch || 
|- id="1999 OX5" bgcolor=#fefefe
| 0 ||  || MBA-I || 17.6 || data-sort-value="0.90" | 900 m || multiple || 1999–2019 || 19 Dec 2019 || 64 || align=left | Disc.: Spacewatch || 
|- id="1999 OY5" bgcolor=#fefefe
| 0 ||  || MBA-I || 18.18 || data-sort-value="0.69" | 690 m || multiple || 1999–2021 || 05 Nov 2021 || 90 || align=left | Disc.: Spacewatch || 
|}
back to top

P 

|- id="1999 PP2" bgcolor=#fefefe
| 1 ||  || MBA-I || 18.74 || data-sort-value="0.52" | 520 m || multiple || 1999–2022 || 02 Oct 2022 || 38 || align=left | Disc.: SpacewatchAdded on 17 January 2021 || 
|- id="1999 PS3" bgcolor=#FFC2E0
| 5 ||  || AMO || 21.7 || data-sort-value="0.16" | 160 m || single || 57 days || 06 Oct 1999 || 50 || align=left | Disc.: LINEAR || 
|- id="1999 PG4" bgcolor=#E9E9E9
| 1 ||  || MBA-M || 17.5 || data-sort-value="0.94" | 940 m || multiple || 1999–2021 || 07 Jan 2021 || 319 || align=left | Disc.: Wykrota Obs. || 
|- id="1999 PQ5" bgcolor=#E9E9E9
| 0 ||  || MBA-M || 17.45 || 1.4 km || multiple || 1999–2021 || 25 Nov 2021 || 71 || align=left | Disc.: Spacewatch || 
|- id="1999 PY6" bgcolor=#fefefe
| 1 ||  || MBA-I || 18.3 || data-sort-value="0.65" | 650 m || multiple || 1999–2019 || 24 Oct 2019 || 39 || align=left | Disc.: Cerro TololoAdded on 22 July 2020 || 
|- id="1999 PC7" bgcolor=#d6d6d6
| 0 ||  || MBA-O || 17.2 || 2.0 km || multiple || 1999–2019 || 03 Apr 2019 || 43 || align=left | Disc.: Cerro Tololo || 
|- id="1999 PL7" bgcolor=#E9E9E9
| 1 ||  || MBA-M || 17.1 || 1.1 km || multiple || 1979–2021 || 18 Jan 2021 || 107 || align=left | Disc.: Palomar Obs.Alt.: 1979 SY, 2017 BU100 || 
|- id="1999 PW7" bgcolor=#E9E9E9
| 1 ||  || MBA-M || 17.7 || 1.6 km || multiple || 1999–2019 || 27 Jan 2019 || 42 || align=left | Disc.: Cerro TololoAlt.: 2010 AB52 || 
|- id="1999 PD9" bgcolor=#fefefe
| 0 ||  || MBA-I || 17.44 || data-sort-value="0.97" | 970 m || multiple || 1999–2021 || 06 Nov 2021 || 182 || align=left | Disc.: Spacewatch || 
|- id="1999 PE9" bgcolor=#E9E9E9
| 0 ||  || MBA-M || 16.70 || 1.4 km || multiple || 1999–2022 || 24 Jan 2022 || 243 || align=left | Disc.: Spacewatch || 
|- id="1999 PF9" bgcolor=#fefefe
| 0 ||  || MBA-I || 17.7 || data-sort-value="0.86" | 860 m || multiple || 1999–2019 || 24 Dec 2019 || 67 || align=left | Disc.: Spacewatch || 
|- id="1999 PG9" bgcolor=#E9E9E9
| 0 ||  || MBA-M || 17.1 || 1.1 km || multiple || 1999–2021 || 11 Jan 2021 || 113 || align=left | Disc.: Spacewatch || 
|- id="1999 PH9" bgcolor=#fefefe
| 0 ||  || MBA-I || 18.65 || data-sort-value="0.55" | 550 m || multiple || 1999–2021 || 13 May 2021 || 74 || align=left | Disc.: Spacewatch || 
|- id="1999 PJ9" bgcolor=#fefefe
| 1 ||  || MBA-I || 18.4 || data-sort-value="0.62" | 620 m || multiple || 1999–2016 || 27 Mar 2016 || 40 || align=left | Disc.: Spacewatch || 
|- id="1999 PK9" bgcolor=#fefefe
| 0 ||  || MBA-I || 18.2 || data-sort-value="0.68" | 680 m || multiple || 1999–2019 || 31 May 2019 || 41 || align=left | Disc.: Spacewatch || 
|- id="1999 PL9" bgcolor=#E9E9E9
| 0 ||  || MBA-M || 17.09 || 1.6 km || multiple || 1999–2021 || 10 Nov 2021 || 83 || align=left | Disc.: Spacewatch || 
|- id="1999 PM9" bgcolor=#E9E9E9
| 0 ||  || MBA-M || 17.99 || data-sort-value="0.75" | 750 m || multiple || 1999–2022 || 07 Jan 2022 || 82 || align=left | Disc.: Spacewatch || 
|- id="1999 PN9" bgcolor=#E9E9E9
| 0 ||  || MBA-M || 18.2 || data-sort-value="0.96" | 960 m || multiple || 1999–2019 || 04 Feb 2019 || 46 || align=left | Disc.: Cerro Tololo || 
|- id="1999 PO9" bgcolor=#d6d6d6
| 0 ||  || MBA-O || 16.76 || 2.5 km || multiple || 1999–2021 || 05 Dec 2021 || 101 || align=left | Disc.: Spacewatch || 
|- id="1999 PP9" bgcolor=#fefefe
| 0 ||  || MBA-I || 18.00 || data-sort-value="0.75" | 750 m || multiple || 1999–2021 || 06 Nov 2021 || 110 || align=left | Disc.: Spacewatch || 
|}
back to top

Q 

|- id="1999 QF1" bgcolor=#E9E9E9
| 2 ||  || MBA-M || 18.2 || data-sort-value="0.96" | 960 m || multiple || 1999–2016 || 25 Sep 2016 || 38 || align=left | Disc.: Spacewatch || 
|- id="1999 QS3" bgcolor=#d6d6d6
| 0 ||  || MBA-O || 18.53 || 1.1 km || multiple || 1999–2021 || 13 Sep 2021 || 31 || align=left | Disc.: AstrovirtelAlt.: 2005 UK464 || 
|- id="1999 QV3" bgcolor=#d6d6d6
| 0 ||  || MBA-O || 16.61 || 2.7 km || multiple || 1999–2022 || 04 Jan 2022 || 153 || align=left | Disc.: Spacewatch || 
|- id="1999 QW3" bgcolor=#fefefe
| 0 ||  || MBA-I || 18.6 || data-sort-value="0.57" | 570 m || multiple || 1999–2016 || 03 Jan 2016 || 42 || align=left | Disc.: Spacewatch || 
|- id="1999 QX3" bgcolor=#E9E9E9
| 0 ||  || MBA-M || 17.3 || 1.9 km || multiple || 1999–2017 || 23 Sep 2017 || 41 || align=left | Disc.: Spacewatch || 
|- id="1999 QY3" bgcolor=#E9E9E9
| 0 ||  || MBA-M || 17.35 || 1.9 km || multiple || 1999–2021 || 10 May 2021 || 98 || align=left | Disc.: Spacewatch || 
|- id="1999 QZ3" bgcolor=#E9E9E9
| 0 ||  || MBA-M || 17.53 || 1.7 km || multiple || 1999–2021 || 07 Apr 2021 || 48 || align=left | Disc.: Spacewatch || 
|}
back to top

R 

|- id="1999 RU2" bgcolor=#FFC2E0
| 5 ||  || AMO || 20.2 || data-sort-value="0.32" | 320 m || single || 61 days || 04 Nov 1999 || 140 || align=left | Disc.: CSS || 
|- id="1999 RP4" bgcolor=#fefefe
| 1 ||  || MBA-I || 18.7 || data-sort-value="0.59" | 550 m || multiple || 1999–2022 || 24 May 2022 || 33 || align=left | Disc.: Spacewatch || 
|- id="1999 RT4" bgcolor=#fefefe
| 0 ||  || MBA-I || 18.39 || data-sort-value="0.62" | 620 m || multiple || 1999–2021 || 05 Jul 2021 || 69 || align=left | Disc.: SpacewatchAlt.: 2014 SA223 || 
|- id="1999 RV4" bgcolor=#fefefe
| 0 ||  || MBA-I || 18.37 || data-sort-value="0.63" | 630 m || multiple || 1999–2021 || 31 Oct 2021 || 139 || align=left | Disc.: SpacewatchAlt.: 2010 RZ2, 2014 VX27 || 
|- id="1999 RF5" bgcolor=#fefefe
| 1 ||  || MBA-I || 19.1 || data-sort-value="0.45" | 450 m || multiple || 1999–2019 || 25 Sep 2019 || 45 || align=left | Disc.: SpacewatchAdded on 22 July 2020 || 
|- id="1999 RK5" bgcolor=#d6d6d6
| 0 ||  || MBA-O || 16.60 || 2.7 km || multiple || 1999–2021 || 08 Sep 2021 || 137 || align=left | Disc.: SpacewatchAlt.: 2008 FR44 || 
|- id="1999 RO5" bgcolor=#d6d6d6
| 0 ||  || MBA-O || 16.7 || 2.5 km || multiple || 1999–2020 || 17 Oct 2020 || 109 || align=left | Disc.: Spacewatch || 
|- id="1999 RW5" bgcolor=#fefefe
| 0 ||  || MBA-I || 17.9 || data-sort-value="0.78" | 780 m || multiple || 1999–2018 || 04 Dec 2018 || 55 || align=left | Disc.: SpacewatchAlt.: 2014 TN25 || 
|- id="1999 RF6" bgcolor=#d6d6d6
| 0 ||  || MBA-O || 17.33 || 1.9 km || multiple || 1999–2021 || 11 Nov 2021 || 44 || align=left | Disc.: SpacewatchAdded on 21 August 2021 || 
|- id="1999 RC7" bgcolor=#fefefe
| 0 ||  || MBA-I || 18.68 || data-sort-value="0.55" | 550 m || multiple || 1999–2022 || 07 Jan 2022 || 61 || align=left | Disc.: Spacewatch || 
|- id="1999 RJ8" bgcolor=#fefefe
| 0 ||  || MBA-I || 18.30 || data-sort-value="0.65" | 650 m || multiple || 1999–2021 || 11 Nov 2021 || 132 || align=left | Disc.: Spacewatch || 
|- id="1999 RQ8" bgcolor=#fefefe
| 0 ||  || MBA-I || 18.25 || data-sort-value="0.67" | 670 m || multiple || 1999–2021 || 02 Oct 2021 || 82 || align=left | Disc.: Spacewatch || 
|- id="1999 RS9" bgcolor=#E9E9E9
| 1 ||  || MBA-M || 17.5 || 1.3 km || multiple || 1999–2020 || 03 Dec 2020 || 97 || align=left | Disc.: SpacewatchAlt.: 2016 SZ24 || 
|- id="1999 RN28" bgcolor=#FFC2E0
| 2 ||  || AMO || 21.1 || data-sort-value="0.21" | 210 m || multiple || 1999–2015 || 01 Nov 2015 || 99 || align=left | Disc.: LINEAR || 
|- id="1999 RP28" bgcolor=#FFC2E0
| 7 ||  || AMO || 22.6 || data-sort-value="0.11" | 110 m || single || 29 days || 06 Oct 1999 || 43 || align=left | Disc.: CSS || 
|- id="1999 RQ28" bgcolor=#FFC2E0
| 1 ||  || AMO || 20.7 || data-sort-value="0.26" | 260 m || multiple || 1999–2008 || 20 Jan 2008 || 124 || align=left | Disc.: LONEOS || 
|- id="1999 RV29" bgcolor=#FA8072
| 2 ||  || MCA || 18.0 || 2.1 km || multiple || 1999–2018 || 08 Jul 2018 || 63 || align=left | Disc.: LINEARAlt.: 2010 OM77, 2014 MA5 || 
|- id="1999 RZ29" bgcolor=#E9E9E9
| 0 ||  || MBA-M || 17.3 || 1.0 km || multiple || 1999–2020 || 06 Dec 2020 || 187 || align=left | Disc.: LINEARAlt.: 2014 EB55 || 
|- id="1999 RC31" bgcolor=#FA8072
| 0 ||  || MCA || 16.97 || 1.2 km || multiple || 1999–2021 || 11 May 2021 || 227 || align=left | Disc.: LINEAR || 
|- id="1999 RZ31" bgcolor=#FFC2E0
| 7 ||  || AMO || 23.8 || data-sort-value="0.062" | 62 m || single || 14 days || 21 Sep 1999 || 42 || align=left | Disc.: LINEAR || 
|- id="1999 RA32" bgcolor=#FFC2E0
| 1 ||  || APO || 21.22 || data-sort-value="0.20" | 200 m || multiple || 1999–2022 || 01 Dec 2022 || 76 || align=left | Disc.: LINEAR || 
|- id="1999 RB32" bgcolor=#FFC2E0
| 0 ||  || AMO || 20.2 || data-sort-value="0.32" | 320 m || multiple || 1999–2018 || 10 Dec 2018 || 363 || align=left | Disc.: LINEAR || 
|- id="1999 RJ33" bgcolor=#FFC2E0
| 7 ||  || AMO || 22.5 || data-sort-value="0.11" | 110 m || single || 16 days || 25 Sep 1999 || 33 || align=left | Disc.: LINEAR || 
|- id="1999 RK33" bgcolor=#FFC2E0
| 7 ||  || AMO || 22.4 || data-sort-value="0.12" | 120 m || single || 10 days || 19 Sep 1999 || 85 || align=left | Disc.: LINEAR || 
|- id="1999 RO36" bgcolor=#FFC2E0
| 5 ||  || AMO || 20.7 || data-sort-value="0.26" | 260 m || single || 67 days || 12 Nov 1999 || 144 || align=left | Disc.: Farpoint Obs. || 
|- id="1999 RQ37" bgcolor=#E9E9E9
| 0 ||  || MBA-M || 17.1 || 1.6 km || multiple || 1997–2021 || 01 Dec 2021 || 81 || align=left | Disc.: Spacewatch || 
|- id="1999 RR40" bgcolor=#E9E9E9
| 0 ||  || MBA-M || 17.77 || 1.2 km || multiple || 1999–2022 || 27 Jan 2022 || 87 || align=left | Disc.: LINEARAlt.: 2016 TV25 || 
|- id="1999 RE42" bgcolor=#d6d6d6
| 0 ||  || MBA-O || 17.06 || 2.2 km || multiple || 1999–2020 || 03 Dec 2020 || 170 || align=left | Disc.: Ondřejov Obs.Alt.: 2015 UA6 || 
|- id="1999 RM45" bgcolor=#FFC2E0
| 0 ||  || APO || 19.76 || data-sort-value="0.40" | 400 m || multiple || 1999–2021 || 11 Nov 2021 || 830 || align=left | Disc.: LINEARPotentially hazardous object || 
|- id="1999 RX65" bgcolor=#E9E9E9
| 0 ||  || MBA-M || 17.5 || data-sort-value="0.94" | 940 m || multiple || 1999–2021 || 12 Jan 2021 || 244 || align=left | Disc.: LINEAR || 
|- id="1999 RY86" bgcolor=#E9E9E9
| 0 ||  || MBA-M || 17.80 || 1.2 km || multiple || 1999–2021 || 06 Nov 2021 || 191 || align=left | Disc.: SpacewatchAlt.: 2008 TQ217 || 
|- id="1999 RP90" bgcolor=#FA8072
| 0 ||  || MCA || 18.1 || 1.0 km || multiple || 1999–2020 || 17 Oct 2020 || 133 || align=left | Disc.: LINEAR || 
|- id="1999 RV163" bgcolor=#E9E9E9
| 0 ||  || MBA-M || 18.27 || data-sort-value="0.93" | 930 m || multiple || 1999–2021 || 30 Oct 2021 || 63 || align=left | Disc.: SpacewatchAlt.: 2017 XO9 || 
|- id="1999 RK170" bgcolor=#fefefe
| 0 ||  || MBA-I || 18.25 || data-sort-value="0.67" | 670 m || multiple || 1999–2021 || 30 Nov 2021 || 99 || align=left | Disc.: SpacewatchAlt.: 2015 AS35 || 
|- id="1999 RW175" bgcolor=#fefefe
| 1 ||  || MBA-I || 19.1 || data-sort-value="0.45" | 450 m || multiple || 1999–2017 || 28 Jan 2017 || 29 || align=left | Disc.: Spacewatch || 
|- id="1999 RA176" bgcolor=#fefefe
| 0 ||  || MBA-I || 18.59 || data-sort-value="0.57" | 570 m || multiple || 1999–2021 || 12 Nov 2021 || 91 || align=left | Disc.: Spacewatch || 
|- id="1999 RS186" bgcolor=#d6d6d6
| 0 ||  || MBA-O || 17.62 || 1.7 km || multiple || 1999–2022 || 27 Jan 2022 || 52 || align=left | Disc.: Spacewatch || 
|- id="1999 RN213" bgcolor=#d6d6d6
| 0 ||  || MBA-O || 16.38 || 2.9 km || multiple || 1999–2021 || 28 Nov 2021 || 166 || align=left | Disc.: Berg. GladbachAlt.: 2010 SS39 || 
|- id="1999 RS214" bgcolor=#C2E0FF
| E ||  || TNO || 7.9 || 90 km || single || 33 days || 09 Oct 1999 || 10 || align=left | Disc.: Mauna Kea Obs.LoUTNOs, cubewano? || 
|- id="1999 RT214" bgcolor=#C2E0FF
| 4 ||  || TNO || 7.79 || 100 km || multiple || 1999–2021 || 08 Aug 2021 || 47 || align=left | Disc.: Mauna Kea Obs.LoUTNOs, cubewano (cold), albedo: 0.210; binary: 69 km || 
|- id="1999 RU214" bgcolor=#C2E0FF
| 3 ||  || TNO || 6.97 || 146 km || multiple || 1999–2021 || 08 Aug 2021 || 23 || align=left | Disc.: Mauna Kea Obs.LoUTNOs, res2:5 || 
|- id="1999 RV214" bgcolor=#C2E0FF
| 4 ||  || TNO || 7.9 || 87 km || multiple || 1999–2015 || 28 May 2015 || 13 || align=left | Disc.: Mauna Kea Obs.LoUTNOs, cubewano (cold) || 
|- id="1999 RW214" bgcolor=#C2E0FF
| 3 ||  || TNO || 7.3 || 115 km || multiple || 1998–2016 || 12 Aug 2016 || 29 || align=left | Disc.: Mauna Kea Obs.LoUTNOs, cubewano (cold) || 
|- id="1999 RX214" bgcolor=#C2E0FF
| 2 ||  || TNO || 6.8 || 145 km || multiple || 1999–2017 || 24 Jul 2017 || 30 || align=left | Disc.: Mauna Kea Obs.LoUTNOs, cubewano (cold), BR-mag: 1.63; taxonomy: IR || 
|- id="1999 RZ214" bgcolor=#C2E0FF
| 2 ||  || TNO || 7.8 || 104 km || multiple || 1999–2017 || 22 Sep 2017 || 17 || align=left | Disc.: Mauna Kea Obs.LoUTNOs, SDO || 
|- id="1999 RB215" bgcolor=#C2E0FF
| 2 ||  || TNO || 9.4 || 48 km || multiple || 1999–2011 || 26 Oct 2011 || 23 || align=left | Disc.: Mauna Kea Obs.LoUTNOs, twotino || 
|- id="1999 RC215" bgcolor=#C2E0FF
| 2 ||  || TNO || 6.9 || 139 km || multiple || 1999–2020 || 21 Jul 2020 || 28 || align=left | Disc.: Mauna Kea Obs.LoUTNOs, cubewano (cold) || 
|- id="1999 RF215" bgcolor=#C2E0FF
| E ||  || TNO || 7.4 || 114 km || single || 65 days || 11 Nov 1999 || 8 || align=left | Disc.: Mauna Kea Obs.LoUTNOs, cubewano? || 
|- id="1999 RG215" bgcolor=#C2E0FF
| 4 ||  || TNO || 7.22 || 120 km || multiple || 1999–2021 || 08 Aug 2021 || 33 || align=left | Disc.: Mauna Kea Obs.LoUTNOs, cubewano (cold) || 
|- id="1999 RJ215" bgcolor=#C2E0FF
| 0 ||  || TNO || 7.4 || 125 km || multiple || 1999–2017 || 22 Jul 2017 || 46 || align=left | Disc.: Mauna Kea Obs.LoUTNOs, SDO, BR-mag: 1.22 || 
|- id="1999 RK215" bgcolor=#C2E0FF
| 4 ||  || TNO || 7.48 || 151 km || multiple || 1999–2018 || 14 Sep 2018 || 24 || align=left | Disc.: Mauna Kea Obs.LoUTNOs, plutino || 
|- id="1999 RR215" bgcolor=#C2E0FF
| 6 ||  || TNO || 8.1 || 80 km || multiple || 1999–2000 || 28 Dec 2000 || 14 || align=left | Disc.: Mauna Kea Obs.LoUTNOs, cubewano (cold) || 
|- id="1999 RT215" bgcolor=#C2E0FF
| E ||  || TNO || 7.1 || 158 km || single || 63 days || 09 Nov 1999 || 9 || align=left | Disc.: Mauna Kea Obs.LoUTNOs, other TNO || 
|- id="1999 RV215" bgcolor=#C2E0FF
| 2 ||  || TNO || 8.4 || 87 km || multiple || 1999–2014 || 22 Oct 2014 || 16 || align=left | Disc.: Mauna Kea Obs.LoUTNOs, other TNO || 
|- id="1999 RW215" bgcolor=#C2E0FF
| 5 ||  || TNO || 7.95 || 93 km || multiple || 1999–2021 || 11 Jan 2021 || 21 || align=left | Disc.: Mauna Kea Obs.LoUTNOs, res3:4 || 
|- id="1999 RX215" bgcolor=#C2E0FF
| 4 ||  || TNO || 7.6 || 100 km || multiple || 1999–2022 || 27 Aug 2022 || 22 || align=left | Disc.: Mauna Kea Obs.LoUTNOs, cubewano (cold) || 
|- id="1999 RC216" bgcolor=#C2E0FF
| E ||  || TNO || 7.3 || 119 km || single || 62 days || 09 Nov 1999 || 10 || align=left | Disc.: Mauna Kea Obs.LoUTNOs, cubewano? || 
|- id="1999 RV216" bgcolor=#E9E9E9
| – ||  || MBA-M || 18.5 || data-sort-value="0.84" | 840 m || single || 12 days || 17 Sep 1999 || 9 || align=left | Disc.: Spacewatch || 
|- id="1999 RD217" bgcolor=#E9E9E9
| 0 ||  || MBA-M || 16.66 || 2.6 km || multiple || 1999–2021 || 12 Aug 2021 || 141 || align=left | Disc.: SpacewatchAlt.: 2017 OJ38 || 
|- id="1999 RE217" bgcolor=#E9E9E9
| 0 ||  || MBA-M || 17.42 || 1.4 km || multiple || 1999–2021 || 27 Nov 2021 || 148 || align=left | Disc.: Spacewatch || 
|- id="1999 RB225" bgcolor=#FA8072
| 0 ||  || MCA || 18.1 || data-sort-value="0.71" | 710 m || multiple || 1999–2021 || 15 Mar 2021 || 99 || align=left | Disc.: LINEAR || 
|- id="1999 RB229" bgcolor=#FA8072
| 1 ||  || MCA || 18.7 || data-sort-value="0.54" | 540 m || multiple || 1999–2021 || 08 Jan 2021 || 129 || align=left | Disc.: Piszkéstető Stn.Added on 19 October 2020 || 
|- id="1999 RH242" bgcolor=#E9E9E9
| 0 ||  || MBA-M || 18.00 || 1.4 km || multiple || 1999–2021 || 08 Jul 2021 || 53 || align=left | Disc.: Spacewatch || 
|- id="1999 RK243" bgcolor=#fefefe
| 0 ||  || MBA-I || 18.8 || data-sort-value="0.52" | 520 m || multiple || 1999–2019 || 25 Sep 2019 || 64 || align=left | Disc.: Spacewatch || 
|- id="1999 RF244" bgcolor=#d6d6d6
| 0 ||  || MBA-O || 16.74 || 2.5 km || multiple || 1999–2022 || 06 Jan 2022 || 206 || align=left | Disc.: Spacewatch || 
|- id="1999 RG244" bgcolor=#E9E9E9
| 0 ||  || MBA-M || 17.68 || 1.2 km || multiple || 1999–2021 || 08 Dec 2021 || 73 || align=left | Disc.: SpacewatchAlt.: 2008 VD30 || 
|- id="1999 RD245" bgcolor=#fefefe
| 0 ||  || MBA-I || 17.9 || data-sort-value="0.78" | 780 m || multiple || 1996–2020 || 10 Dec 2020 || 153 || align=left | Disc.: SpacewatchAlt.: 2006 SO63, 2008 AR78 || 
|- id="1999 RL245" bgcolor=#d6d6d6
| 0 ||  || MBA-O || 16.3 || 3.1 km || multiple || 1999–2021 || 24 Oct 2021 || 173 || align=left | Disc.: SpacewatchAlt.: 2010 LR72 || 
|- id="1999 RE250" bgcolor=#fefefe
| 0 ||  || MBA-I || 18.1 || data-sort-value="0.71" | 710 m || multiple || 1999–2021 || 01 May 2021 || 124 || align=left | Disc.: SpacewatchAlt.: 2012 QN12 || 
|- id="1999 RM250" bgcolor=#E9E9E9
| 0 ||  || MBA-M || 17.4 || data-sort-value="0.98" | 980 m || multiple || 1999–2021 || 07 Jan 2021 || 82 || align=left | Disc.: Spacewatch || 
|- id="1999 RR250" bgcolor=#E9E9E9
| 1 ||  || MBA-M || 17.8 || data-sort-value="0.82" | 820 m || multiple || 1999–2021 || 11 Jan 2021 || 101 || align=left | Disc.: SpacewatchAdded on 17 January 2021Alt.: 2016 XP28 || 
|- id="1999 RT250" bgcolor=#E9E9E9
| 0 ||  || MBA-M || 18.01 || 1.1 km || multiple || 1999–2021 || 02 Oct 2021 || 60 || align=left | Disc.: Spacewatch || 
|- id="1999 RV250" bgcolor=#E9E9E9
| 0 ||  || MBA-M || 18.1 || 1.0 km || multiple || 1995–2020 || 15 Oct 2020 || 78 || align=left | Disc.: SpacewatchAlt.: 2012 XD90 || 
|- id="1999 RW250" bgcolor=#d6d6d6
| 0 ||  || MBA-O || 16.42 || 2.9 km || multiple || 1999–2021 || 08 Sep 2021 || 162 || align=left | Disc.: SpacewatchAlt.: 2014 HP33 || 
|- id="1999 RB251" bgcolor=#fefefe
| 0 ||  || MBA-I || 18.5 || data-sort-value="0.59" | 590 m || multiple || 1999–2020 || 20 Jul 2020 || 40 || align=left | Disc.: Spacewatch || 
|- id="1999 RL251" bgcolor=#d6d6d6
| 0 ||  || MBA-O || 16.73 || 2.5 km || multiple || 1999–2021 || 06 Nov 2021 || 82 || align=left | Disc.: SpacewatchAlt.: 2010 TR120 || 
|- id="1999 RM251" bgcolor=#E9E9E9
| 0 ||  || MBA-M || 17.3 || 1.9 km || multiple || 1999–2017 || 15 Aug 2017 || 40 || align=left | Disc.: SpacewatchAlt.: 2006 EJ21, 2013 TF66 || 
|- id="1999 RQ251" bgcolor=#fefefe
| – ||  || MBA-I || 19.1 || data-sort-value="0.45" | 450 m || single || 14 days || 17 Sep 1999 || 9 || align=left | Disc.: Spacewatch || 
|- id="1999 RH253" bgcolor=#d6d6d6
| 0 ||  || MBA-O || 16.53 || 2.8 km || multiple || 1999–2021 || 01 Dec 2021 || 126 || align=left | Disc.: SpacewatchAlt.: 2010 PT31, 2015 TY283 || 
|- id="1999 RU253" bgcolor=#fefefe
| 0 ||  || MBA-I || 18.5 || data-sort-value="0.59" | 590 m || multiple || 1999–2018 || 18 Jun 2018 || 46 || align=left | Disc.: SpacewatchAdded on 22 July 2020 || 
|- id="1999 RK257" bgcolor=#C2E0FF
| E ||  || TNO || 8.3 || 91 km || single || 1 day || 13 Sep 1999 || 6 || align=left | Disc.: Mauna Kea Obs.LoUTNOs, other TNO || 
|- id="1999 RS259" bgcolor=#fefefe
| 0 ||  || MBA-I || 19.22 || data-sort-value="0.43" | 430 m || multiple || 1999–2021 || 09 Dec 2021 || 37 || align=left | Disc.: SpacewatchAdded on 21 August 2021 || 
|- id="1999 RV259" bgcolor=#d6d6d6
| 0 ||  || MBA-O || 16.4 || 2.9 km || multiple || 1999–2021 || 03 Dec 2021 || 184 || align=left | Disc.: Spacewatch || 
|- id="1999 RW259" bgcolor=#E9E9E9
| 0 ||  || MBA-M || 17.13 || 1.6 km || multiple || 1999–2021 || 23 Nov 2021 || 137 || align=left | Disc.: Astrovirtel || 
|- id="1999 RX259" bgcolor=#fefefe
| 0 ||  || MBA-I || 18.64 || data-sort-value="0.56" | 560 m || multiple || 1999–2021 || 24 Oct 2021 || 127 || align=left | Disc.: Spacewatch || 
|- id="1999 RY259" bgcolor=#E9E9E9
| 0 ||  || MBA-M || 17.07 || 1.6 km || multiple || 1999–2021 || 02 Dec 2021 || 65 || align=left | Disc.: Spacewatch || 
|- id="1999 RZ259" bgcolor=#d6d6d6
| 0 ||  || MBA-O || 16.24 || 3.1 km || multiple || 1999–2021 || 06 Nov 2021 || 142 || align=left | Disc.: Spacewatch || 
|- id="1999 RA260" bgcolor=#E9E9E9
| 0 ||  || MBA-M || 17.43 || 1.4 km || multiple || 1999–2021 || 07 Nov 2021 || 110 || align=left | Disc.: Spacewatch || 
|- id="1999 RB260" bgcolor=#d6d6d6
| 0 ||  || MBA-O || 16.94 || 2.3 km || multiple || 1999–2021 || 06 Oct 2021 || 84 || align=left | Disc.: Spacewatch || 
|- id="1999 RC260" bgcolor=#E9E9E9
| 0 ||  || MBA-M || 18.18 || data-sort-value="0.97" | 970 m || multiple || 1999–2021 || 04 Oct 2021 || 68 || align=left | Disc.: Spacewatch || 
|- id="1999 RD260" bgcolor=#fefefe
| 0 ||  = (619177) || MBA-I || 18.46 || data-sort-value="0.60" | 600 m || multiple || 1999–2021 || 01 Nov 2021 || 73 || align=left | Disc.: Spacewatch || 
|- id="1999 RE260" bgcolor=#fefefe
| 1 ||  || MBA-I || 18.6 || data-sort-value="0.57" | 570 m || multiple || 1999–2016 || 04 Oct 2016 || 41 || align=left | Disc.: Spacewatch || 
|- id="1999 RF260" bgcolor=#E9E9E9
| 1 ||  || MBA-M || 17.5 || data-sort-value="0.94" | 940 m || multiple || 1999–2019 || 27 Oct 2019 || 71 || align=left | Disc.: CSS || 
|- id="1999 RG260" bgcolor=#E9E9E9
| 0 ||  || MBA-M || 17.2 || 1.5 km || multiple || 1999–2021 || 06 Jan 2021 || 82 || align=left | Disc.: Spacewatch || 
|- id="1999 RH260" bgcolor=#E9E9E9
| 0 ||  || MBA-M || 17.34 || 1.0 km || multiple || 1995–2022 || 26 Jan 2022 || 105 || align=left | Disc.: Spacewatch || 
|- id="1999 RJ260" bgcolor=#fefefe
| 1 ||  || MBA-I || 18.1 || data-sort-value="0.71" | 710 m || multiple || 1999–2018 || 12 Feb 2018 || 42 || align=left | Disc.: Spacewatch || 
|- id="1999 RL260" bgcolor=#E9E9E9
| 0 ||  || MBA-M || 17.71 || data-sort-value="0.85" | 850 m || multiple || 1999–2022 || 27 Jan 2022 || 75 || align=left | Disc.: Spacewatch || 
|- id="1999 RM260" bgcolor=#E9E9E9
| 1 ||  || MBA-M || 17.8 || 1.2 km || multiple || 1999–2020 || 11 Sep 2020 || 48 || align=left | Disc.: Astrovirtel || 
|- id="1999 RN260" bgcolor=#fefefe
| 0 ||  || MBA-I || 18.29 || data-sort-value="0.65" | 650 m || multiple || 1999–2022 || 27 Jan 2022 || 31 || align=left | Disc.: Spacewatch || 
|- id="1999 RO260" bgcolor=#fefefe
| 0 ||  || MBA-I || 18.5 || data-sort-value="0.59" | 590 m || multiple || 1999–2018 || 02 Nov 2018 || 59 || align=left | Disc.: Spacewatch || 
|- id="1999 RP260" bgcolor=#E9E9E9
| 0 ||  || MBA-M || 17.07 || 2.1 km || multiple || 1999–2021 || 13 May 2021 || 83 || align=left | Disc.: Spacewatch || 
|- id="1999 RQ260" bgcolor=#fefefe
| 0 ||  || MBA-I || 18.3 || data-sort-value="0.65" | 650 m || multiple || 1999–2020 || 30 Jan 2020 || 56 || align=left | Disc.: Spacewatch || 
|- id="1999 RR260" bgcolor=#E9E9E9
| 0 ||  || MBA-M || 17.89 || 1.1 km || multiple || 1999–2021 || 26 Nov 2021 || 60 || align=left | Disc.: Spacewatch || 
|- id="1999 RS260" bgcolor=#fefefe
| 0 ||  || MBA-I || 18.2 || data-sort-value="0.68" | 680 m || multiple || 1999–2020 || 10 Dec 2020 || 56 || align=left | Disc.: Spacewatch || 
|- id="1999 RT260" bgcolor=#fefefe
| 0 ||  || MBA-I || 18.57 || data-sort-value="0.57" | 570 m || multiple || 1999–2021 || 25 Nov 2021 || 99 || align=left | Disc.: Spacewatch || 
|- id="1999 RU260" bgcolor=#d6d6d6
| 0 ||  || MBA-O || 17.0 || 2.2 km || multiple || 1999–2020 || 05 Nov 2020 || 56 || align=left | Disc.: Spacewatch || 
|- id="1999 RV260" bgcolor=#fefefe
| 0 ||  || MBA-I || 18.7 || data-sort-value="0.54" | 540 m || multiple || 1999–2019 || 22 Aug 2019 || 56 || align=left | Disc.: Spacewatch || 
|- id="1999 RW260" bgcolor=#E9E9E9
| 0 ||  || MBA-M || 17.4 || data-sort-value="0.98" | 980 m || multiple || 1999–2021 || 11 Jan 2021 || 113 || align=left | Disc.: Spacewatch || 
|- id="1999 RX260" bgcolor=#d6d6d6
| 0 ||  || MBA-O || 16.68 || 2.6 km || multiple || 1999–2021 || 30 Jun 2021 || 71 || align=left | Disc.: Spacewatch || 
|- id="1999 RY260" bgcolor=#E9E9E9
| 0 ||  || MBA-M || 17.02 || 1.2 km || multiple || 1999–2021 || 06 Jan 2021 || 132 || align=left | Disc.: Spacewatch || 
|- id="1999 RZ260" bgcolor=#d6d6d6
| 0 ||  || MBA-O || 16.76 || 2.5 km || multiple || 1999–2022 || 27 Jan 2022 || 103 || align=left | Disc.: Spacewatch || 
|- id="1999 RA261" bgcolor=#E9E9E9
| 0 ||  || MBA-M || 17.3 || 1.9 km || multiple || 1999–2021 || 08 Jun 2021 || 46 || align=left | Disc.: Spacewatch || 
|- id="1999 RB261" bgcolor=#E9E9E9
| 0 ||  || MBA-M || 17.87 || 1.1 km || multiple || 1999–2021 || 09 Nov 2021 || 67 || align=left | Disc.: SpacewatchAdded on 19 October 2020 || 
|- id="1999 RC261" bgcolor=#fefefe
| 2 ||  || MBA-I || 19.3 || data-sort-value="0.41" | 410 m || multiple || 1999–2020 || 23 Sep 2020 || 51 || align=left | Disc.: SpacewatchAdded on 19 October 2020 || 
|- id="1999 RD261" bgcolor=#d6d6d6
| 0 ||  || MBA-O || 16.8 || 2.4 km || multiple || 1999–2020 || 17 Oct 2020 || 88 || align=left | Disc.: SpacewatchAdded on 17 January 2021Alt.: 2014 MC90 || 
|- id="1999 RF261" bgcolor=#E9E9E9
| 3 ||  || MBA-M || 18.1 || data-sort-value="0.71" | 710 m || multiple || 1999–2020 || 17 Nov 2020 || 34 || align=left | Disc.: SpacewatchAdded on 17 January 2021 || 
|}
back to top

References 
 

Lists of unnumbered minor planets